= Garwood =

Garwood can refer to:

== Communities ==
all in the United States

- Garwood, Idaho, an unincorporated community in Kootenai County
- Garwood, Missouri, an unincorporated community in Reynolds County
- Garwood, New Jersey, a borough in Union County
  - Garwood station, a New Jersey Transit railroad station on the Raritan Valley Line
  - Garwood Public Schools, a community public school district
- Garwood, Texas, an unincorporated community in Colorado County
- Garwood, West Virginia, an unincorporated community in Wyoming County

== Geography ==
- Garwood Glacier, in Victoria Land, Antarctica
- Garwood Lake, in Berrien County, Michigan, U.S.
- Garwood Point, in Marie Byrd Land, Antarctica
- Garwood Valley, in Victoria Land, Antarctica
- Lake Garwood, in Victoria Land, Antarctica

== People ==
=== Surname ===
==== Acting and production ====
- Kelton Garwood (1928–1991), American actor and father of golfer Doug Garwood
- Norman Garwood (1946–2019), English art director and production designer
- Patricia Garwood (1941–2019), English television, film and stage actress
- William Garwood (1884–1950), American silent-film actor and director

==== Music ====
- Duke Garwood (born 1969), British multi-instrumentalist
- Margaret Garwood (1927–2015), American composer
- Matthew Garwood, Australian operatic and musical theatre singer

==== Sports ====
- Colin Garwood (born 1949), English footballer
- Doug Garwood (born 1963), American golfer and son of actor Kelton Garwood
- Len Garwood (1923–1979), English footballer
- Phil Garwood (1939–2011), Australian rules footballer
- Rex Garwood (1930–2007), Australian rules footballer and cricket player
- Walter Garwood (1849–1885), New Zealand cricketer

==== Writing ====
- Haley Elizabeth Garwood (born 1940), American historical novelist
- Julie Garwood (1944–2023), American author

==== Other ====
- Edmund Johnston Garwood (1864–1949), British geologist
- John A. Garwood (1932–2010), American politician in North Carolina
- Richard Garwood (born 1959), Air Marshall in the Royal Air Force
- Robert R. Garwood (1946), United States Marine Corps soldier and former prisoner-of-war
- Tirzah Garwood (1908–1951) British artist and engraver
- W. St. John Garwood (1896–1987), American lawyer and judge
- William Lockhart Garwood (1931–2011), United States circuit judge

=== Given name ===
- Garwood L. Judd (1823–1902), American lawyer and politician from New York
- Garwood Whaley (1942), American percussionist

=== Other ===
- Addie Garwood Estes (1868–1928), American temperance activist
- Garfield "Gar" Wood (1880–1971), American inventor, entrepreneur, motorboat enthusiast, and founder of Garwood Industries

== Other uses ==
- Garwood Industries Minigun, a type of machine gun
- Garwood Load Packer, a type of garbage truck
- John and Cynthia Garwood Farmstead, a historic home and farm located in Indiana, U.S.
