= Arthur L. Johnson =

Arthur Lacey Johnson (1868 or 1869 – 1955) was an educator in the U.S. state of New Jersey and the namesake of Arthur L. Johnson High School in Clark.

== Biography ==
Arthur L. Johnson was born in Standing Stone Township, Pennsylvania. He served as the superintendent of schools for Union County, founding Union County College and helping organize the Union County Band and Orchestra Summer School and the Eastern Conservatory of Music and Arts.

He also helped establish the county's regional high school system, which lasted until July 1997.

Johnson died at age 86 in Elizabeth, New Jersey on May 16, 1955, shortly before the new high school in Clark was set to open. The district opted to name the school, which was a part of county district and now operates as part of the Clark Public Schools System, in his honor.
