= Union County Regional High School District =

School district in New Jersey, United States

Union County Regional High School District was a regional public school district that served students in ninth through twelfth grades at four high schools in Union County, New Jersey, United States. Established in 1937 as the state's first regional high school district, conflict between the constituent municipalities about school funding and grievances related to the closure of one of the four schools led to the passage of a referendum for the district's dissolution in May 1996, which took effect at the end of the 1996-97 school year. The Commissioner of the New Jersey Department of Education called Union County Regional "the highest-spending regional high school in the state".

== History ==
=== Formation and growth ===
The district's six participating municipalities -- Berkeley Heights, Clark, Garwood, Kenilworth, Mountainside and Springfield Township -- began class in September 1937 at Jonathan Dayton Regional High School in Springfield, which was named for founding father Jonathan Dayton.

Arthur L. Johnson Regional High School, named for a longtime county superintendent who had advocated for regionalization, opened in September 1956. The school was constructed at a cost of $2 million and included 94,000 square feet (8,700 m^{2}) of space for classes and other facilities.

In September 1960, Governor Livingston Regional High School opened its doors to 800 students from Berkeley Heights and Mountainside. Designed to accommodate an enrollment of 900, projected increases in the numbers of students lead the district to consider a $1.5 million expansion to add capacity for an additional 600 students before the school had even opened.

The name David Brearley Regional High School was chosen in March 1964 to honor David Brearley one of four New Jersey signatories of the Constitution of the United States, along with Jonathan Dayton and William Livingston who had already had high schools in the district named for them. A groundbreaking ceremony was held in May 1964 for the new school facility, which would be the fourth high school in the district and was expected to be the first in the state with air conditioning and electric heating. The school opened to 640 students from Kenilworth in September 1966. The original building contained 40 classrooms, an auditorium with a capacity of 820, a cafeteria with a capacity of 430, a gymnasium with a capacity of 2,000, and offices.

=== Deregionalization ===
With enrollment declining, costs rising on a per-student basis and budgets being rejected by voters, the district approved a recommendation to close David Brearley and have the students from Garwood and Kenilworth, the two lowest-income communities in the district, be shifted to Jonathan Dayton. In the wake of the closure of David Brearley High School, groups of residents pushed for a measure that would allow for deregionalization of school districts, which was part of legislation introduced in 1993 by Richard Bagger in the New Jersey General Assembly.

By 1993, with nearly three-quarters of all teachers at the top of the salary scale and enrollment having dropped by more than 60% from a peak of 6,000 in 1971, the district was the highest-spending in the state with a cost per pupil of $15,594, which The New York Times noted was "much more than many top private schools charge for tuition". With property taxes being based on equalized value in each municipality and with significant differences in numbers of students from each community, sharp discrepancies developed in the costs per student (school taxes paid divided by the number of students attending high school), with Garwood paying $8,600 per pupil while Mountainside's cost per pupil was more than double that, at $20,000.

In the May 1996 referendum, 55% of ballots cast were in favor of dissolving the district, with "yes" votes prevailing in Berkeley Heights, Kenilworth, Mountainside and Springfield, though 88% of Clark residents and 97% of those from Garwood opposed the measure.

With the district's dissolution in 1997, the four high school facilities owned by the regional district were turned over to the host municipalities, with all four communities becoming K-12 districts. David Brearley High School, which had been closed by the district in 1992 due to declining enrollment and projected cost savings, became part of the Kenilworth Public Schools; Jonathan Dayton High School (which had 629 students from both Kenilworth and Springfield) was added to the Springfield Public Schools; Arthur L. Johnson High School (with 763 students from Clark and Garwood) was taken over by the Clark Public School District; and Governor Livingston High School (with 735 students from Berkeley Heights and Mountainside) shifted to the Berkeley Heights Public Schools. The two remaining communities without school facilities in their borders remained as K-8 districts and established sending/receiving relationships for grades 9-12, with Garwood Public Schools sending to Arthur L. Johnson and Mountainside School District with Governor Livingston.

== Schools ==
Schools in the district were:

- Jonathan Dayton Regional High School, Springfield Township, opened 1937
- Arthur L. Johnson Regional High School, Clark, opened 1956
- Governor Livingston Regional High School, Berkeley Heights, opened 1960
- David Brearley Regional High School, Kenilworth, opened 1966 and closed 1993

== Board of education ==
The district was operated by a nine-member board of education with membership apportioned on the basis of municipal populations. Originally, Garwood, Kenilworth, and Springfield had two members each, while Berkeley Heights, Clark, and Mountainside had one member each. Following the 1960 Census, the board was reapportioned with Berkeley Heights and Clark gaining a member while Garwood and Kenilworth lost a member. This apportionment was maintained through the district's dissolution in 1997.
