= Springfield Public Schools (New Jersey) =

School district in Union County, New Jersey, US

Coordinates: 40.700772°N 74.322952°W

Address
- 139 Mountain Avenue Springfield Township, Union County, New Jersey, 07081; United States

District information
- Grades: PreK-12
- Superintendent: Rachel Goldberg
- Business administrator: Michelle Calas
- Schools: 5

Students and staff
- Enrollment: 2,236 (as of 2022–23)
- Faculty: 168.3 FTEs
- Student–teacher ratio: 13.3:1

Other information
- District Factor Group: GH
- Website: www.springfieldschools.com
Ind.	Per pupil	District spending	Rank (*)	K-12 average	%± vs. average
1A	Total Spending	$17,604	29	$18,891	−6.8%
1	Budgetary Cost	13,463	28	14,783	−8.9%
2	Classroom Instruction	7,864	25	8,763	−10.3%
6	Support Services	2,053	34	2,392	−14.2%
8	Administrative Cost	1,272	10	1,485	−14.3%
10	Operations & Maintenance	1,753	47	1,783	−1.7%
13	Extracurricular Activities	403	40	268	50.4%
16	Median Teacher Salary	68,157	50	64,043
Data from NJDoE 2014 Taxpayers' Guide to Education Spending. *Of K-12 districts with 1,800-3,500 students. Lowest spending=1; Highest=68

The Springfield Public Schools is a comprehensive community public school district serving students in pre-kindergarten through twelfth grade from Springfield Township, in Union County, in the U.S. state of New Jersey.

As of the 2022–23 school year, the district, comprising five schools, had an enrollment of 2,236 students and 168.3 classroom teachers (on an FTE basis), for a student–teacher ratio of 13.3:1.

The district is classified by the New Jersey Department of Education as being in District Factor Group "GH", the third-highest of eight groupings. District Factor Groups organize districts statewide to allow comparison by common socioeconomic characteristics of the local districts. From lowest socioeconomic status to highest, the categories are A, B, CD, DE, FG, GH, I and J.

== History ==
Springfield Township became one of the six constituent municipalities of the Union County Regional High School District when it was established, joining Berkeley Heights, Clark, Garwood, Kenilworth and Mountainside. The district opened for students in September 1937, with the district's first facility being Jonathan Dayton Regional High School in Springfield, which was named for founding father Jonathan Dayton. Amid conflict between the constituent municipalities about financing a district described as "the highest-spending regional high school in the state" and anger from residents impacted by the closure of David Brearley High School, a referendum was held in May 1996, in which voters approved a proposal to break up the regional district. With the district's dissolution at the end of the 1996–97 school year, Jonathan Dayton High School was turned over to the Springfield Public Schools, which became a K–12 district.

== Schools ==
Schools in the district (with 2022–23 enrollment data from the National Center for Education Statistics) are:

Elementary schools

- Edward V. Walton Early Childhood Center with 551 students in grades PreK-2
  - Adriana B. Coppola, principal
- James Caldwell Elementary School with 292 students in grades 3-5
  - David Rennie, principal
- Thelma L. Sandmeier Elementary School with 245 students in grades 3-5
  - Michael C. Plias, principal

Middle school

- Florence M. Gaudineer Middle School with 518 students in grades 6-8
  - Timothy P. Kielty, principal

High school

- Jonathan Dayton High School with 659 students in grades 9-12
  - Norman Francis Jr., principal

== Administration ==
Core members of the district's administration are:

- Rachel Goldberg, superintendent
- Michelle Calas, school business administrator and board secretary

== Board of education ==
The district's board of education, comprised of nine members, sets policy and oversees the fiscal and educational operation of the district through its administration. As a Type II school district, the board trustees are elected directly by voters to serve three-year terms on a staggered basis, with three seats up for election each year, held since 2012 as part of the November general election. The board appoints a superintendent to oversee the district's day-to-day operations and a business administrator to supervise its business functions.
