= Jonathan Dayton High School =

High school in Union County, New Jersey, US

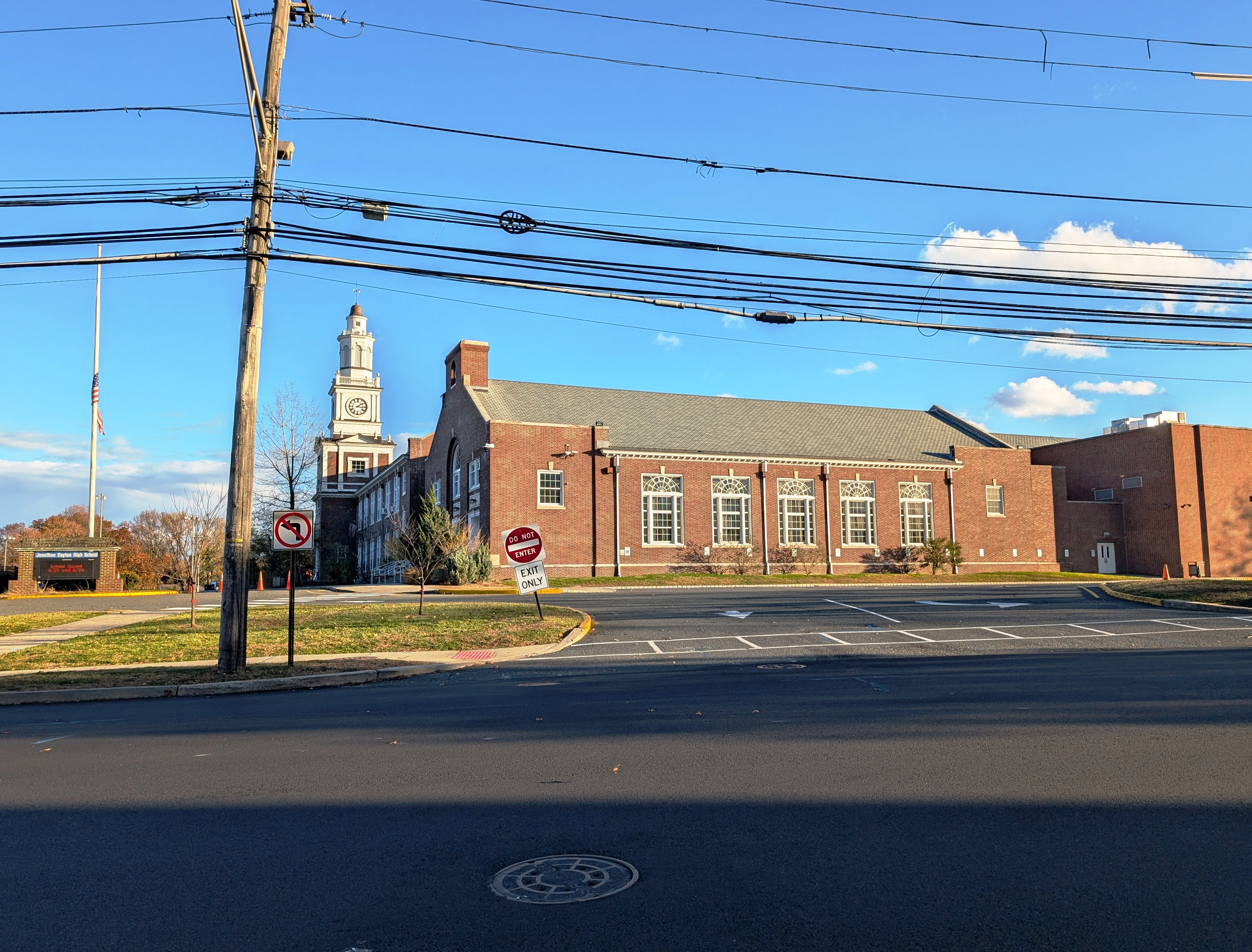

Location
- 139 Mountain Avenue; Springfield Township, Union County, New Jersey 07081; United States; 40.707172°N 74.314747°W

Information
- Type: Public high school
- Established: 1937 (as regional school); 1997 (as part of Springfield district)
- NCES School ID: 341563000213
- Principal: Norman Francis
- Faculty: 47.4 FTEs
- Grades: 9-12
- Enrollment: 654 (as of 2024–25)
- Student to teacher ratio: 13.8:1
- Campus: Open
- Colors: Royal blue and Orange
- Athletics conference: Union County Interscholastic Athletic Conference (general); Big Central Football Conference (football)
- Team name: Bulldogs
- Accreditation: Middle States Association of Colleges and Schools
- Publication: Jargon (literary magazine)
- Newspaper: The Dawg Print
- Website: jdhs.springfieldschools.com

Jonathan Dayton High School is a four-year comprehensive public high school serving students in ninth through twelfth grades in Springfield Township, in Union County, in the U.S. state of New Jersey. The school is part of the Springfield Public Schools and is named after Jonathan Dayton, a signer of the United States Constitution. The school is accredited by the Middle States Association of Colleges and Schools Commission on Elementary and Secondary Schools.

As of the 2024–25 school year, the school had an enrollment of 654 students and 47.4 classroom teachers (on an FTE basis), for a student–teacher ratio of 13.8:1. There were 105 students (16.1% of enrollment) eligible for free lunch and 24 (3.7% of students) eligible for reduced-cost lunch.

== History ==
Springfield Township became one of the six constituent municipalities of the Union County Regional High School District when it was established, joining Berkeley Heights, Clark, Garwood, Kenilworth and Mountainside. Voters approved the construction of the district's first high school in Springfield at a referendum held November 1, 1935, just eleven days after a successful referendum to create the district. The school opened to students in September 1937 as the first school in the district. The original building contained 27 classrooms, three science labs, three shops, a library, a cafeteria, a gymnasium, an auditorium, and offices.

The school has been expanded several times in subsequent years. A former Civilian Conservation Corps administration building was moved to the site from Meisel Avenue in March 1942 to serve as a classroom for the vocational program in agriculture. The agriculture program continued until 1970, when it was discontinued due to the decline in farming within the district. A 21-room addition was completed in September 1953 at a cost of $1.32 million after being approved by voters in a November 1951 referendum. The addition contained 20 classrooms, three science labs, two shops, two music rooms, a gymnasium, and offices; renovations were completed to portions of the original building at the same time. On May 4, 1971, voters approved a $4.7 million bond referendum to expand and renovate each school in the district. At Dayton, the addition of three science labs, two classrooms, two music rooms, an auxiliary gymnasium, and an instructional media center, and various renovations and expansions were completed by September 1973. An athletic complex was completed on the school's front lawn in September 2013.

Amid conflict between the constituent municipalities about financing a district described as "the highest-spending regional high school in the state" and anger from residents impacted by the closure of David Brearley High School, a referendum was held in May 1996 in which voters approved a proposal to breakup the regional district. With the district's dissolution at the end of the 1996–97 school year Jonathan Dayton High School was turned over to the Springfield Public Schools, which became a K-12 district.

== Awards, recognition and rankings ==
In the 2011 "Ranking America's High Schools" issue by The Washington Post, the school was ranked 60th in New Jersey and 1,732nd nationwide. The school was the 991st-ranked public high school in the United States out of over 26,000 schools in the country, 29th in the state of New Jersey, in Newsweek magazine's "America's Top High Schools 2010" edition.

The school was the 113th-ranked public high school in New Jersey out of 339 schools statewide in New Jersey Monthly magazine's September 2014 cover story on the state's "Top Public High Schools", using a new ranking methodology. The school had been ranked 26th in the state of 328 schools in 2012, after being ranked 40th in 2010 out of 322 schools listed. The magazine ranked the school 32nd in 2008 out of 316 schools. The school was ranked 44th in the magazine's September 2006 issue, which included 316 schools across the state. Schooldigger.com ranked the school tied for 76th out of 381 public high schools statewide in its 2011 rankings (an increase of 109 positions from the 2010 ranking) which were based on the combined percentage of students classified as proficient or above proficient on the mathematics (89.5%) and language arts literacy (96.4%) components of the High School Proficiency Assessment (HSPA).

In its 2013 report on "America's Best High Schools", The Daily Beast ranked the school 716th in the nation among participating public high schools and 55th among schools in New Jersey.

== Curriculum ==
Jonathan Dayton offers Advanced Placement (AP) classes in the humanities (AP English Language and Composition, AP Art History, AP Studio Art, AP Music Theory, AP United States History, AP European History, and AP Psychology), sciences (AP Chemistry, AP Physics, and AP Biology), and (AP Calculus BC and AP Statistics) and AP Computer Science. All students have laptops.

== Extracurricular activities ==
=== Publications ===
Jonathan Dayton is home to three publications, The Dawg Print, Jargon, and the yearbook. The former is the school's newspaper, which is released tri-yearly. Jargon is Jonathan Dayton's Literary Magazine, which displays the school's body of creative writing. Jargon's content can be submitted through the school's creative writing classes, or of the writer's own accord.

=== Athletics ===
The Jonathan Dayton High School Bulldogs compete in the Union County Interscholastic Athletic Conference, following a reorganization of sports leagues in Northern New Jersey by the New Jersey State Interscholastic Athletic Association (NJSIAA). With 451 students in grades 10–12, the school was classified by the NJSIAA for the 2019–20 school year as Group I for most athletic competition purposes, which included schools with an enrollment of 75 to 476 students in that grade range. Prior to the NJSIAA's 2010 realignment, the school had participated in the Mountain Valley Conference, which included schools in Essex County and Union County. The football team competes in Division 1B of the Big Central Football Conference, which includes 60 public and private high schools in Hunterdon, Middlesex, Somerset, Union and Warren counties, which are broken down into 10 divisions by size and location. The school was classified by the NJSIAA as Group II North for football for 2024–2026, which included schools with 484 to 683 students.

Sports offered at Jonathan Dayton High School include:

- Fall Sports: Football (Varsity, JV & Freshman), Soccer (Boys', Varsity & JV), Soccer (Girls', Varsity & JV), Cross Country (Boys & Girls, Varsity), Volleyball (Varsity & JV), Gymnastics (Varsity), Cheerleading (Varsity) and Tennis (Girls' Varsity & JV).
- Winter Sports: Bowling (Co-ed JV, Varsity) Basketball (Boys' Varsity, JV & Freshman), Basketball (Girls' Varsity & JV), Indoor Track (Boys' & Girls' Varsity), Swimming (Co-ed, Varsity), Ice Hockey (co-op with David Brearley High School), Cheerleading (Varsity & JV) and Wrestling (co-op with David Brearley High School).
- Spring Sports: - Baseball (Varsity & JV), Softball (Varsity & JV), Boys' Lacrosse (Varsity & JV), Girls' Lacrosse (Varsity & Jv), Spring Track (Boys' & Girls, Varsity & JV), Tennis (Boys' Varsity & JV) and Golf (Co-ed Varsity)

The school participates as the host school / lead agency in joint cooperative gymnastics, ice hockey and co-ed swimming teams with David Brearley High School; the co-op ice hockey team also includes Union High School. Brearley is the host school for a joint wrestling team. These co-op programs operate under agreements scheduled to expire at the end of the 2023–24 school year.

The boys' basketball team won the Group III state championship in 1950, defeating Union Hill High School in the tournament final.

The boys' track team won the Group I/II indoor relay state championships in 1971; the girls' track team won the Group II title in 1984.

The boys' tennis team won the Group I state championship in 2001 (defeating Haddon Township High School in the tournament's final match), 2007 (vs. Pennsville Memorial High School), 2008 (vs. Point Pleasant Beach High School) and 2009 (vs. New Milford High School). The boys tennis team won the North II Group I state sectional championship in four consecutive years 2006, 2007, 2008, 2009 and the Mountain Valley Conference in 2008 and 2009. The boys tennis team has won the Group I state championship in three consecutive years 2007, 2008, 2009 and four times overall including a state championship in 2001. The 2001 team won the Group I title with a 3–2 win against Haddon Township in the tournament finals at Mercer County Park. The 2008 team won the North II, Group I state sectional championship with a 3–2 win in the tournament final over Ridgefield Memorial High School. The boys tennis team won the 2007 North II, Group I state sectional championship with a 4–1 win against Ridgefield Memorial High School. The team moved on to win the 2007 NJSIAA Group I state championship, defeating Pennsville Memorial High School 4–1 in the final matches. The ice hockey team won the Monsignor Kelly Cup in 2003.

The boys' wrestling team, operated in combination with David Brearley High School, won the 2006 and 2007 Central Jersey Group I state sectional title defeating Roselle Park High School 39–20 in 2006 and 46–10 in 2007. In 2008 the wrestling team won the North II Group II sectional title defeating South Plainfield High School by a score of 34–23 at South Plainfield High School. The team was a finalist in the Group I state championship before losing to Paulsboro High School at the Ritacco Center in Toms River in 2007 and a Group II state finalist in 2008, losing to Long Branch High School by a score of 30–27.

The boys' soccer team was Group I co-champion in 2009 with Palmyra High School.

The girls' spring track team was the Group I state champion in 2009.

The boys' lacrosse team was introduced in 2017, followed by a girls' lacrosse team in 2020.

The boys' lacrosse Team won the Kirst Division Championship in 2020 defeating Pompton Lakes High School.

The girls' volleyball team won back-to-back-to-back-to-back sectional championships from 2020-2024.

The baseball team won the sectional championship in 2024 defeating rival David Brearley High School.

The softball team Won the Union County Championship in 2024 defeating Scotch Plains-Fanwood High School. This was the first time Dayton had won a county championship since 1954, when major leaguer Joe Schaffernoth led the baseball team to the title.

== Demographics ==
As of the 2006 - 2007 school year:

Males: 47%
Females: 53%

Total Teachers = 46
Teacher - Student Ratio = 1:12 (NJ Average = 1:14)

| Ethnicity | Dayton | NJ Average |
|---|---|---|
| American Indian | 1% | n/a |
| Asian | 7% | 7% |
| Hispanic | 12% | 20% |
| Black | 16% | 19% |
| White | 64% | 54% |

== Administration ==
The school's principal is Norman Francis. Core members of the school's administration include the assistant principal.

== Notable alumni ==
- Dan Avidan (born 1979), singer-songwriter of Ninja Sex Party and Starbomb; co-host of Let's Play webseries Game Grumps
- Roy Belliveau (born 1929, class of 1948), former professional basketball player who played in the American Basketball League and Eastern Professional Basketball League
- Anthony Cioffi (born 1994), football safety who played college football for Rutgers University and was signed by the Oakland Raiders
- John P. Gallagher (1932–2011), politician who represented the 13th Legislative District in the New Jersey Senate from 1982 to 1984
- P. F. Kluge (born 1942), novelist
- Curt Merz (1938–2022), guard who played in the NFL for the Kansas City Chiefs
- Claudio Reyna (born 1973), former professional soccer player who is sporting director of Austin FC
- Jeff Ross (born 1965), comedian (born Jeffrey Ross Lifschultz)
- Joe Schaffernoth (1937–2016), pitcher who played on the Chicago Cubs
- Bitty Schram (born 1968), actress best known for playing Sharona Fleming in the television series Monk and for playing Evelyn Gardner in the 1992 film A League of Their Own
- Roger C. Smith (born 1937), Brigadier General, United States Air Force. Joint Chiefs of Staff Representative to the U.S.- Soviet Union Defense and Space Talks 1986–1988, Geneva Switzerland. Commander of a 150 Minuteman Missile Wing; Chief of Policy Analysis for three Secretaries of the United States Air Force
- James Yee (born c. 1968), United States Army chaplain
