= Robinson Plantation House =

Historic house in New Jersey, United States

- Seventeenth Century Clark House
- U.S. National Register of Historic Places
- New Jersey Register of Historic Places
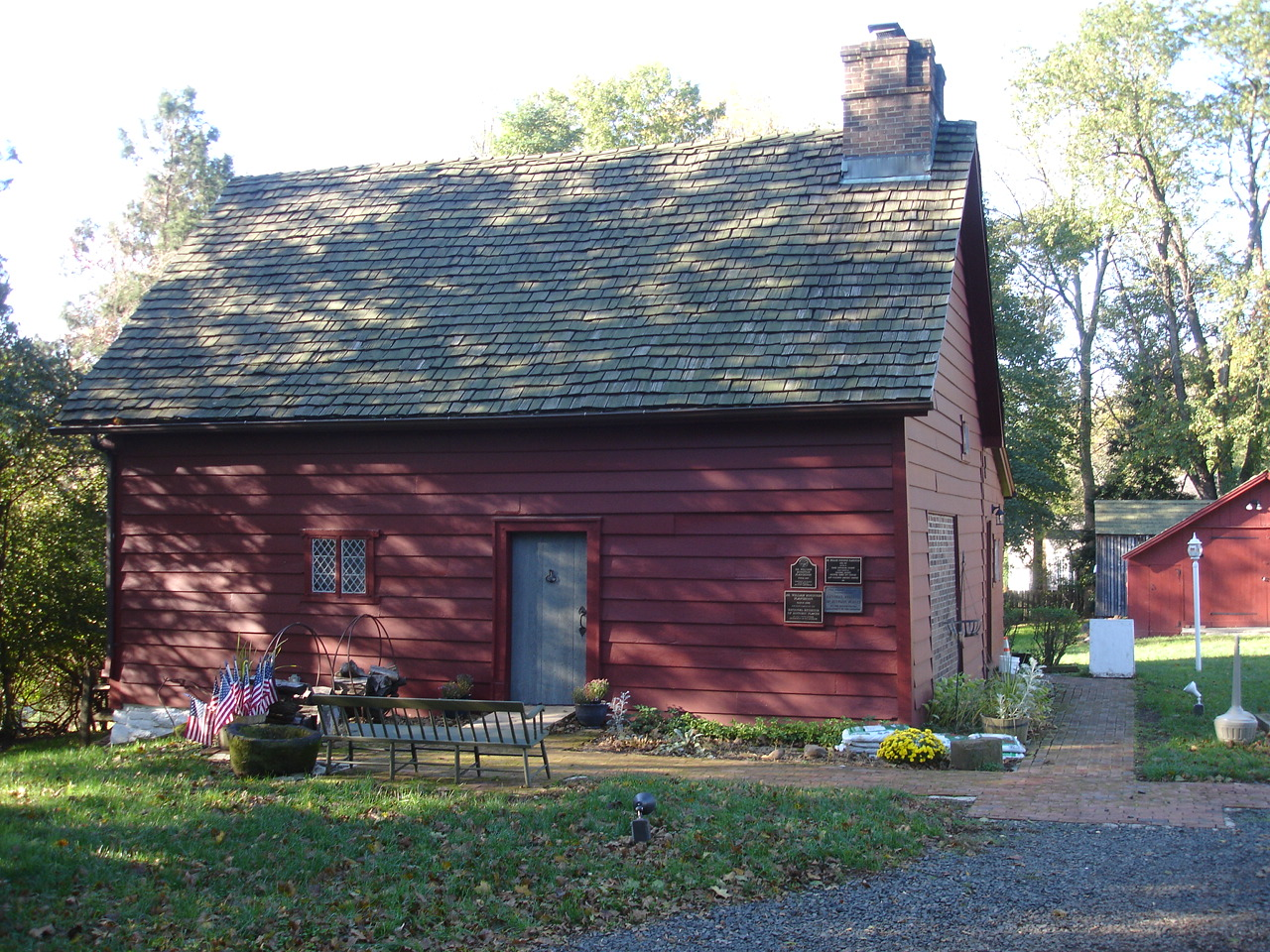
- The Dr. William Robinson Plantation House in fall of 2011

- Location within Union County, New Jersey Location within New Jersey Location within the United States
- Location: 593 Madison Hill Road, Clark, New Jersey
- Coordinates: 40°36′49″N 74°18′36″W
- Area: 1.3 acres (0.53 ha)
- Built: ca. 1690
- NRHP reference No.: 74001193
- NJRHP No.: 2651

Significant dates
- Added to NRHP: November 19, 1974
- Designated NJRHP: July 1, 1974

The Robinson Plantation House is a historic house in Clark, New Jersey built around 1690 on territory that was part of the Elizabethtown Tract, and was once part of Rahway. It was added to the National Register of Historic Places in 1974 as Seventeenth Century Clark House. The owner of the house, Dr. William Robinson, was the first official landowner in Clark, NJ. He was one of only a few physicians in New Jersey at the time, and built a medicine room in the house to practice "Physick," a then-popular form of healing using plants and herbs. He also performed Chirurgery

The Squire Hartshorne House is another home from the 17th century located in Clark.

== See also ==
- Homestead Farm at Oak Ridge
- List of the oldest buildings in New Jersey
- National Register of Historic Places listings in New Jersey
- National Register of Historic Places listings in Union County, New Jersey
- The Robinson's Branch of the Rahway River.
- The Robinson's Branch Reservoir.
