= Robinson's Branch Reservoir =

Reservoir in Clark, New Jersey, U.S.

Coordinates: 40.620°N 74.313°W

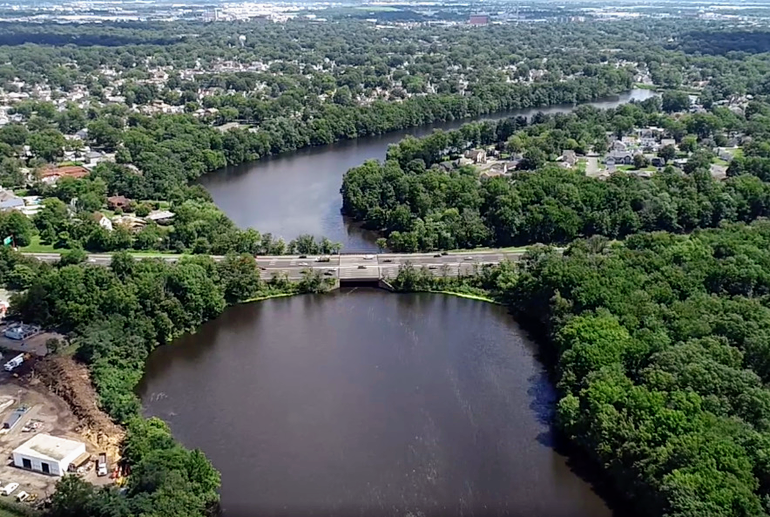
Robinson's Branch Reservoir in Clark, New Jersey. The Garden State Parkway bridge is seen crossing over the reservoir

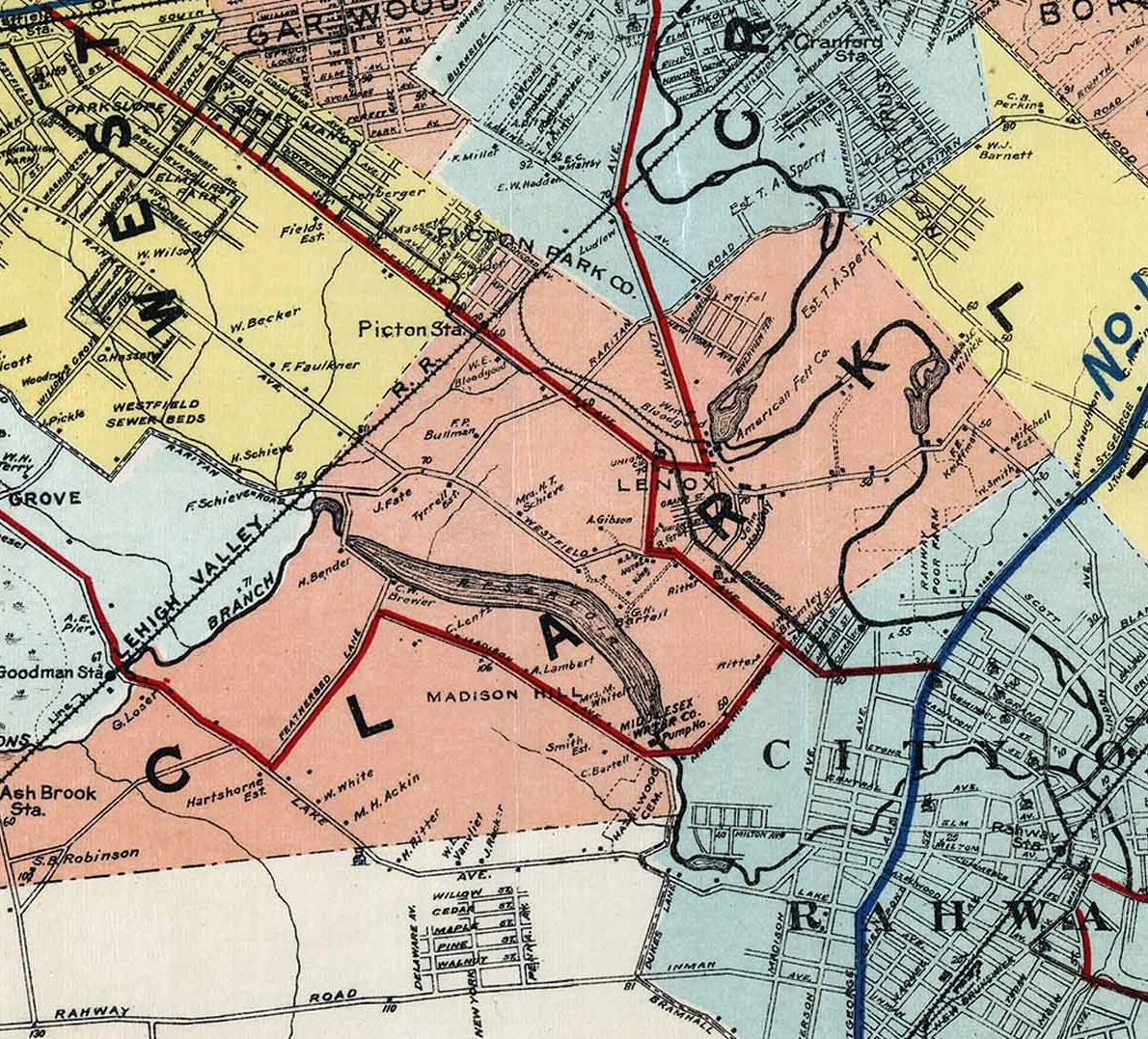
The reservoir on a 1923 map of Clark, New Jersey

The Robinson's Branch Reservoir is a decommissioned water reservoir in Clark, New Jersey. It is the largest body of water in Union County.

Other names for the reservoir include the Clark Reservoir and the Middlesex Reservoir, after its former owner, the Middlesex Water Company.

The reservoir sits along the Robinsons Branch of the Rahway River. Clark residents have sunbathed, fished and bird-watched along the edges of the Robinson's Branch Reservoir since its inception. The County of Union is currently rehabilitating the area for recreational enjoyment, and has created a flyover aerial video of the site for the public.

== Location and features ==
The Robinson's Branch Reservoir area of habitat, formerly owned by Middlesex Water, is roughly 150 acres (61 ha) (older reports give 136 acres), of which 94 acres (38 ha) consist of surface waters. In the mid-1990s, the reservoir had the capacity to serve 232 million US gallons (880 million litres) daily and features a tributary drainage area of approximately 25 square miles (65 km^{2}).

The shoreline of the reservoir creates a roughly four-mile loop through Clark Township.

The reservoir has been called a "rare habitat type" by the New Jersey Audubon Society and the Arthur Kill Watershed Association.

The reservoir is bridged by the Featherbed Lane, Raritan Road and Garden State Parkway bridges.

The southern end is bounded by the Robinson's Branch Reservoir Dam, approximately two miles upstream from the confluence with the main Rahway River.

Arthur L. Johnson High School abuts the property, as do a number of athletic fields.

== History ==
In 1907, the Middlesex Water Company created the reservoir by damming the Robinsons Branch, a tributary of the Rahway River named for an early English settler and physician named Dr. William Robinson. The reservoir was used by Middlesex Water Company for municipal supply until 1970.

In 1967, a young teenage boy drowned while attempting to swim across the reservoir with his friends. In 1972, a Clark father drowned in attempting to save two teenagers who had fallen through ice while skating, one of whom also perished in the water.

In the 1990s, following efforts by the Middlesex Water Company to drain the reservoir so as to avoid costs associated with a legally mandated upgrade of the dam, a group of Clark residents formed the Robinson's Branch Reservoir Preservation Committee to save the reservoir. In 1997, the water company agreed to transfer ownership of the site to the Township of Clark, including an easement to the New Jersey Conservation Foundation.

It was purchased by Union County for $1 in 2008 for preservation as public open space. As of 2011, Union County was developing a master plan for the former water company reservoir in Clark.

== Restoration in the 2020s ==
As of 2022, following complaints by Clark residents that the reservoir had been neglected and lacked public access for recreation, the county began to pursue restoration of the site and the addition of a nature trail. The county had spent the previous decade resolving encroachments onto the public land. A walking trail, a fishing pier, a boat launch, gardens and playgrounds are among the many options proposed by residents. Citizens have also proposed opportunities for environmental education and activities at the site.
