= David Joseph Weeks =

American neuropsychologist (born 1944)

David Joseph Weeks (born 1944) is an American neuropsychologist, educator and author best known for his study of eccentricity.

Born and raised in Garwood, New Jersey, he graduated from Arthur L. Johnson High School in 1962. Weeks moved to Scotland in 1975. He practices at the Royal Edinburgh Hospital. Weeks is the author of two popular books on the study of eccentrism, Eccentrics: The Scientific Investigation (1988) and Eccentrics: A Study of Sanity and Strangeness (1995).
