= Erik Rosenmeier =

American football player (born 1965)

No. 75
- Position: Center

Personal information
- Born: May 26, 1965 (age 61); Plainfield, New Jersey, U.S.
- Listed height: 6 ft 4 in (1.93 m)
- Listed weight: 240 lb (109 kg)

Career information
- High school: Clark (NJ) Arthur L. Johnson
- College: Colgate
- NFL draft: 1987: undrafted

Career history
- Buffalo Bills (1987)

Career NFL statistics
- Games played: 1
- Stats at Pro Football Reference

Erik Michael Rosenmeier (born May 26, 1965) is an American former professional football player who was a center for the Buffalo Bills of the National Football League (NFL) in 1987. He played college football for the Colgate Raiders.

Rosenmeier grew up in Clark, New Jersey, and graduated from Arthur L. Johnson High School in 1983.
