= Arthur L. Johnson High School =

High school in Union County, New Jersey, US

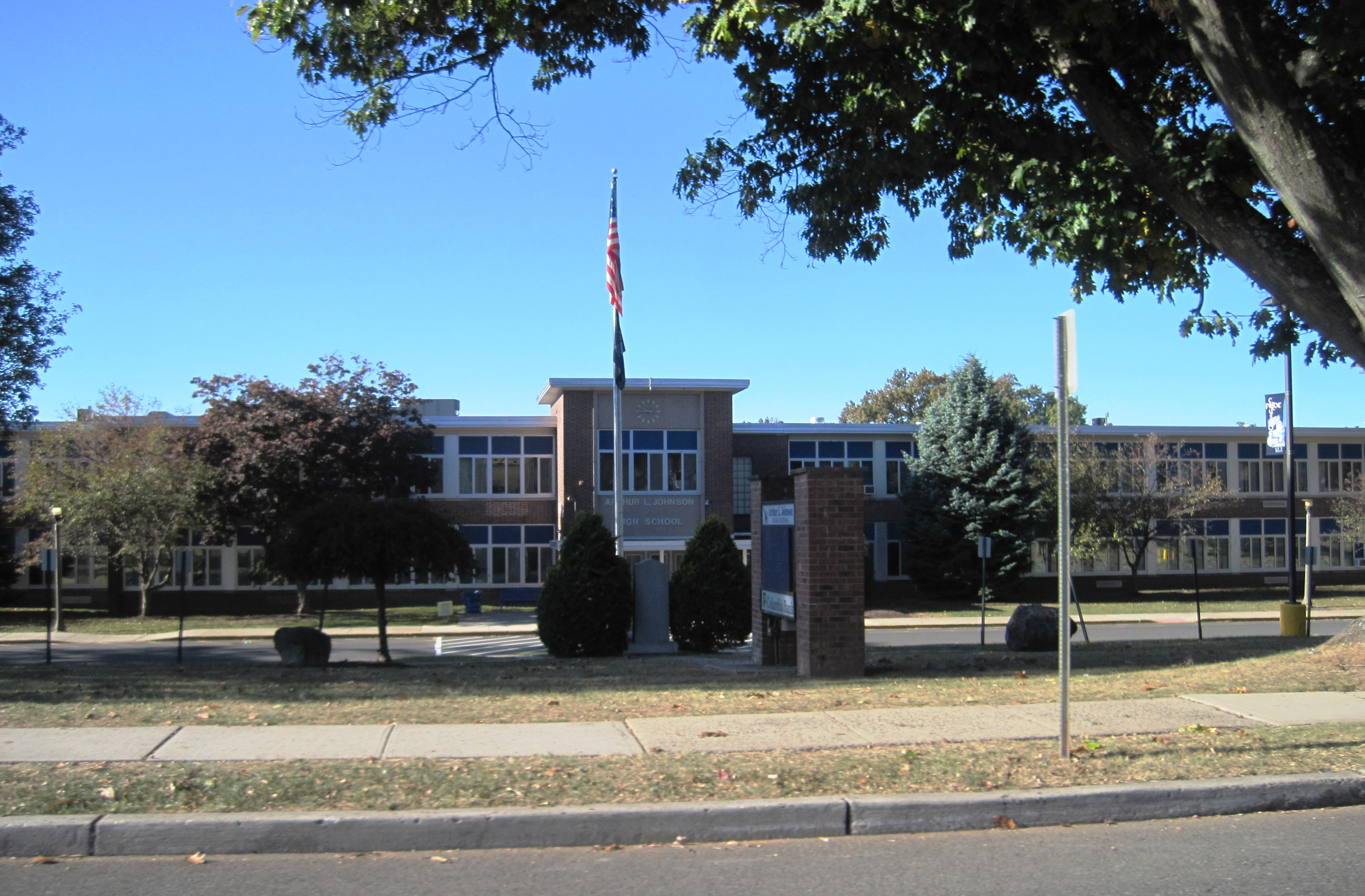
- Front of the school

Location
- 365 Westfield Avenue; Clark, Union County, New Jersey 07066; United States; 40.623114°N 74.311967°W

Information
- Type: Public high school
- Established: 1956
- School district: Clark Public School District
- NCES School ID: 340315000205
- Principal: Tara Oliveira
- Faculty: 62.0 FTEs
- Grades: 9-12
- Enrollment: 785 (as of 2024–25)
- Student to teacher ratio: 12.7:1
- Colors: Navy Blue and white
- Athletics conference: Union County Interscholastic Athletic Conference (general); Big Central Football Conference (football)
- Accreditation: Middle States Association of Colleges and Schools
- Alumni: ALJalumni.org
- Website: alj.clarkschools.org

Arthur L. Johnson High School is a four-year public high school that serves students in ninth through twelfth grades from Clark and Garwood in Union County, in the U.S. state of New Jersey, operating as the lone secondary school of the Clark Public School District. The school has been accredited by the Middle States Association of Colleges and Schools Commission on Elementary and Secondary Schools since 1963 and is accredited until January 2030.

Students from Garwood attend the high school as part of a sending/receiving relationship with the Garwood Public Schools.

As of the 2024–25 school year, the school had an enrollment of 785 students and 62.0 classroom teachers (on an FTE basis), for a student–teacher ratio of 12.7:1. There were 66 students (8.4% of enrollment) eligible for free lunch and 13 (1.7% of students) eligible for reduced-cost lunch.

The school's campus abuts the planned Clark Reservoir Recreation Area, an area of woodland surrounding the decommissioned Robinson's Branch Reservoir (also known as the Clark Reservoir), which is currently being rehabilitated for water recreation.

== History ==
By the early 1950s, Jonathan Dayton Regional High School in Springfield, the sole school of the Union County Regional High School District, had become overcrowded. In November 1953, voters approved a $1.95 million bond referendum to purchase two sites in Clark and Berkeley Heights and construct a high school on the Clark site. Constructed on a site covering 25 acres (10 ha) and including 94,000 square feet (8,700 m^{2}) of space for classes and other facilities, the school opened in September 1956 and was named for a longtime county superintendent who was a leading advocate for the establishment of a regional school district. In April 1957, voters approved a $3.8 million bond referendum that included funds for an addition at Johnson. The addition opened in September 1959 and contained 14 classrooms as well as a boys' gymnasium and special classrooms. On May 4, 1971, voters approved a $4.7 million bond referendum to expand and renovate each school in the district. At Johnson, the addition of an instructional media center, two general education classrooms, and several special classrooms, and various renovations and expansions were completed by September 1973.

Amid conflict between the constituent municipalities about financing a district described as "the highest-spending regional high school in the state" and anger from residents impacted by the closure of David Brearley High School, a referendum was held in May 1996 in which voters approved a proposal to break up the regional district. With the district's dissolution at the end of the 1996-97 school year, Arthur L. Johnson High School was turned over to the Clark Public School District, which became a K-12 district. Garwood, one of the two municipalities without a high school, established a sending/receiving relationship to send its high school students to Arthur L. Johnson.

== Awards, recognition and rankings ==
In the 2011 "Ranking America's High Schools" issue by The Washington Post, the school was ranked 47th in New Jersey and 1,493rd nationwide. The school was ranked 1609th, the 62nd-highest in New Jersey, in Newsweek magazine's 2010 rankings of America's Best High Schools.

In its 2013 report on "America's Best High Schools", The Daily Beast ranked the school 898th in the nation among participating public high schools and 67th among schools in New Jersey.

The school was the 86th-ranked public high school in New Jersey out of 339 schools statewide in New Jersey Monthly magazine's September 2014 cover story on the state's "Top Public High Schools", using a new ranking methodology. The school had been ranked 40th in the state of 328 schools in 2012, after being ranked 101st in 2010 out of 322 schools listed. The magazine ranked the school 95th in 2008 out of 316 schools. The school was ranked 91st in the magazine's September 2006 issue, which surveyed 316 schools across the state. Schooldigger.com ranked the school tied for 115th out of 381 public high schools statewide in its 2011 rankings (an increase of 29 positions from the 2010 ranking) which were based on the combined percentage of students classified as proficient or above proficient on the mathematics (84.1%) and language arts literacy (97.5%) components of the High School Proficiency Assessment (HSPA).

In 2019, the school was ranked 241st out of 438 high schools in New Jersey in rankings by U.S. News & World Report.

== Athletics ==
The Arthur L. Johnson High School Crusaders compete in the Union County Interscholastic Athletic Conference, which is comprised of public and private high schools in Union County, and was established following a reorganization of spots leagues in Northern New Jersey under the jurisdiction of the New Jersey State Interscholastic Athletic Association (NJSIAA). Before the 2010 realignment, the school had participated in the Mountain Valley Conference, which consisted of public and private high schools in Essex County and Union County. With 520 students in grades 10-12, the school was classified by the NJSIAA for the 2019–20 school year as Group II for most athletic competition purposes, which included schools with an enrollment of 486 to 758 students in that grade range. The football team competes in Division 2B of the Big Central Football Conference, which includes 60 public and private high schools in Middlesex, Hunterdon, Somerset, Union and Warren counties, which are broken down into 10 divisions by size and location. The school was classified by the NJSIAA as Group II South for football for 2024–2026, which included schools with 514 to 685 students.

The boys' bowling team won the overall state championship in 1985 and the Group I state championship in 2013.

The football team won the North II Group II state sectional titles in 1995 and 2002. The 1995 team finished the season with a record of 11-0 after winning the North II Group II sectional championship game with a 21-6 victory against a Summit High School team that came into the tournament as the number-one seed.

The field hockey team won the North II Group II state sectional titles in 2008, 2010 and 2011.

The cheerleading team won the NJCDCA Group II state championship title in 2017.

The ice hockey team won the McMullen Cup in 2020, defeating Frisch School by a score of 7–3 in the tournament final.

== Administration ==
The school's principal is Tara Oliveira. Her administration team includes the assistant principal.

== Notable alumni ==
- Todd Burger (born 1970), former professional football player who played in the NFL for the Chicago Bears and New York Jets
- David Durante (born 1980), former member of the United States men's national artistic gymnastics team and alternate for the 2008 Summer Olympics
- Kenneth Ham (born 1964), piloted the Space Shuttle Discovery as a member of the STS-124 mission that delivered components to the International Space Station
- Gennaro Nigro (born 2000), soccer player for Potenza Calcio of Serie C
- Ed Pinkham (born 1953), college football coach who was the defensive pass game coordinator for the Arkansas State Red Wolves
- Matt Poskay (born 1984), professional lacrosse player who has played for the Boston Cannons and set a national high school record of 362 career goals
- Erik Rosenmeier (born 1965, class of 1983), former NFL center who played for the Buffalo Bills in 1987
- Frank Spaziani (born 1947), former head coach of the Boston College Eagles football team
- David Joseph Weeks (born 1944), neuropsychologist, educator and author best known for his study of eccentricity
