= Roy Belliveau =

American basketball player (1930–2026)

Personal information
- Born: June 8, 1930 Irvington, New Jersey, U.S.
- Died: September 24, 2026 (aged 96) Lanoka Harbor, New Jersey, U.S.
- Listed height: 6 ft 5 in (1.96 m)

Career information
- High school: Jonathan Dayton Regional (Springfield Township, New Jersey)
- College: Seton Hall (1949–1952)
- NBA draft: 1952: 4th round
- Drafted by: New York Knicks
- Playing career: 1952–1958
- Position: Forward
- Coaching career: 1961–1963, 1971–1973

Career history

Playing
- 1952–1953: Scranton Miners
- 1954–1955; 1956–1957: Williamsport Billies
- 1958: Easton Madisons

Coaching
- 1961–1963: South Brunswick HS
- 1971–1973: Plainfield HS

Career highlights
- EPBL champion (1954); All-EPBL Second Team (1955)
- Stats at Basketball Reference

Roy Nelson Belliveau (June 8, 1930 – September 24, 2026) was an American professional basketball player. He played college basketball for the Seton Hall Pirates. Belliveau played professionally in the American Basketball League (ABL) and Eastern Professional Basketball League (EPBL). He won an EPBL championship in 1954 and was named to the All-EPBL Second Team in 1955. Belliveau worked as a high school teacher and basketball coach in New Jersey after his retirement from playing.

== Early life ==
Raised in Springfield Township, Union County, New Jersey, Belliveau was one of five brothers who attained athletic success while attending Jonathan Dayton High School, where he graduated in 1948. He was an all-state basketball player and set several records in the javelin throw. Belliveau was selected as the New Jersey Amateur Athlete of the Year in 1948.

Belliveau attended Seton Hall University on a track scholarship and also played on the basketball and football teams. He was a starter on the basketball team and scored 652 career points. In 1952, Belliveau broke the program record for javelin throw with 210 ft 9.5 in (64.25 m).

He was inducted into the Seton Hall University Athletics Hall of Fame in 1986.

== Professional playing career ==
Belliveau was selected by the New York Knicks in the 1952 NBA draft. He declined to play for the Knicks because he did not believe that their financial offer was sufficient. Belliveau played for the Scranton Miners in the American Basketball League during the 1952–53 season. On August 24, 1953, his NBA player rights were traded to the Baltimore Bullets; Belliveau also refused to join them because their offers were insufficient.

In February 1954, Belliveau was signed by the Williamsport Billies of the Eastern Professional Basketball League (EPBL). He won an EPBL championship with the Billies in 1954. Belliveau was named to the All-EPBL Second Team in 1955. He missed the 1955–56 season due to a stint in the United States Army and returned to the Billies for the 1956–57 season.

In February 1958, Belliveau was signed by the Easton Madisons who were in need of replacements for players who had to play in an Army tournament.

== Coaching career ==
Belliveau had his first coaching role at South Brunswick High School during its inaugural year in 1960 and introduced basketball to the school. He coached junior varsity during the 1960–61 season and varsity from 1961 to 1963.

Then a resident of Green Brook Township, New Jersey, Belliveau began to teach in the Plainfield Public School District in 1967 including as a special education teacher at Woodland School. In October 1971, he was hired as the head varsity basketball coach at Plainfield High School. He resigned in 1973 after amassing a 9–29 record in two seasons.

== Personal life and death ==
Belliveau had three children with his wife. He died on September 24, 2026, at the age of 96.
