= Ed Pinkham (American football) =

American football player and coach (born 1953)

Biographical details
- Born: September 6, 1953 (age 73)

Playing career
- 1971–1974: Allegheny

Coaching career (HC unless noted)
- 1975–1976: Allegheny (WR/DB)
- 1977–1983: New Hampshire (DB)
- 1984–1988: New Hampshire (DC)
- 1989–1991: Minnesota (DB)
- 1992–1995: New Holy Cross (DC)
- 1996–2007: Colgate (DC)
- 2008: Rutgers (DB)
- 2009–2010: Rutgers (DC)
- 2011–2012: Elon (DC)
- 2013–2016: Western Michigan (DC)
- 2017–2018: UMass (DC)
- 2019: Arkansas State (interim DL)
- 2020: Arkansas State (DPGC)

Accomplishments and honors

Awards
- Allegheny Hall of Fame; Associated Press (AP) All-America honors; 4× All-PAC selection

Ed Pinkham (born September 6, 1953) is a former American college football coach who was most recently the defensive pass game coordinator for the Arkansas State Red Wolves. He is a former American college football player for the Allegheny Gators and a native of Clark, New Jersey.

== Playing career ==
Pinkham started playing football in his youth. He played at Arthur L. Johnson High School. In college, he played for the Allegheny Gators from 1971 to 1974 on defense and special teams. As a defender, he posted 14 career interceptions (a second all-time in program history), including a PAC-leading six picks as a freshman in 1971. Pinkham averaged 22.9 yards per kick return, scoring two touchdowns over his career, and 13.8 yards per return with three touchdowns on punt returns. His two punt return touchdowns in a single season ties him for the most in Allegheny history.

== Coaching career ==
=== Early years (1975 to 2007) ===
Ed Pinkham has been coaching for over 40 years, 30 years of which were spent at the defensive coordinator position.

In 1989, he became a secondary coach for the University of Minnesota's Golden Gophers. While there, Pinkham oversaw the outside linebackers, before moving over to the secondary. He was also the secondary coach and defensive coordinator for nearly twelve years at the University of New Hampshire. At the College of the Holy Cross, Pinkham was defensive coordinator and associate head coach for a total of four seasons. Pinkham was also the defensive coordinator for Colgate from 1996 through 2008. The Raiders captured five Patriot League titles during Pinkham's tenure at Colgate, and earned five trips to the NCAA Football Championship Subdivision playoffs. Pinkham's defensive unit was the leader for the Patriot League's total defense stats in 1999, 2003, 2004 and 2006, and three times paced the league in rushing defense.

=== Return to division one (2008 to 2012) ===
Pinkham returned to the Football Championship Subdivision level at Elon, where his defense rated third nationally against the pass, allowing an average of just 153.55 yards per game through the air. Pinkham's Phoenix defense accumulated 17 sacks, topping its previous season total by four. Pinkham would serve in the same capacity at Rutgers from 2009 to 2010. During Pinkham's first season as co-defensive coordinator, he helped Rutgers defense pursue great feats, as the Scarlet Knights ranked in the top-20 in five categories, including leading the nation in tackles for loss and ranking second in turnover rate. Under Pinkham, Rutgers was 15th in the country in rushing defense, 16th in scoring defense and 18th in total defense.

=== Western Michigan University (2013 to 2017) ===
When Pinkham coached at Western Michigan University, the team had the third-ranked scoring defense in the Mid-American Conference at 25 points per game and second in total defense at 371 yards per game. They ranked 15th nationally in scoring defense (19.8 points per game), 26th in total defense (353.6 yards per game) and tied for first in turnover margin (plus-18), and helped lead the team to a 13–0 season.

=== Revival of UMass (2017 to 2018) ===
Pinkham begin coaching at UMass in 2017 as their new defensive coordinator. The team went 4–8 in 2017, their best record in five years. Pinkham has received good reviews both from his players and outside observers for helping to turn the Minutemen around. His time at UMass saw the program record its most wins in back-to-back seasons in its seven-year history as an FBS member, while also collecting its first win over a team from one of the power-five conferences.

=== Later years (2019 to 2021) ===
Pinkham entered his first season as the Arkansas State Red Wolves interior defensive line coach in 2019. He was released on October 16, 2020. He coached for the Alphas in The Spring League in 2021.

== Bowl games ==
Ed Pinkham has coached in a bowl game six times over the course of his career, with a 4–2 record.

Year	Team	Bowl	Opponent	Result
January 5, 2008	Rutgers	International Bowl	Ball State	W 52–30
December 29, 2008	Rutgers	PapaJohns.com Bowl	North Carolina State	W 29–23
December 19, 2009	Rutgers	St. Petersburg Bowl	Central Florida	W 45–24
December 20, 2014	Western Michigan	Famous Idaho Potato Bowl	Air Force Falcons	L 38–24
December 24, 2015	Western Michigan	Bahamas Bowl	Middle Tennessee Blue Raiders	W 45–31
January 2, 2017	Western Michigan	Cotton Bowl Classic	Wisconsin Badgers	L 24–16
