= Robinsons Branch =

Tributary of the Rahway River in New Jersey

Coordinates: 40°36′40″N 74°16′30″W

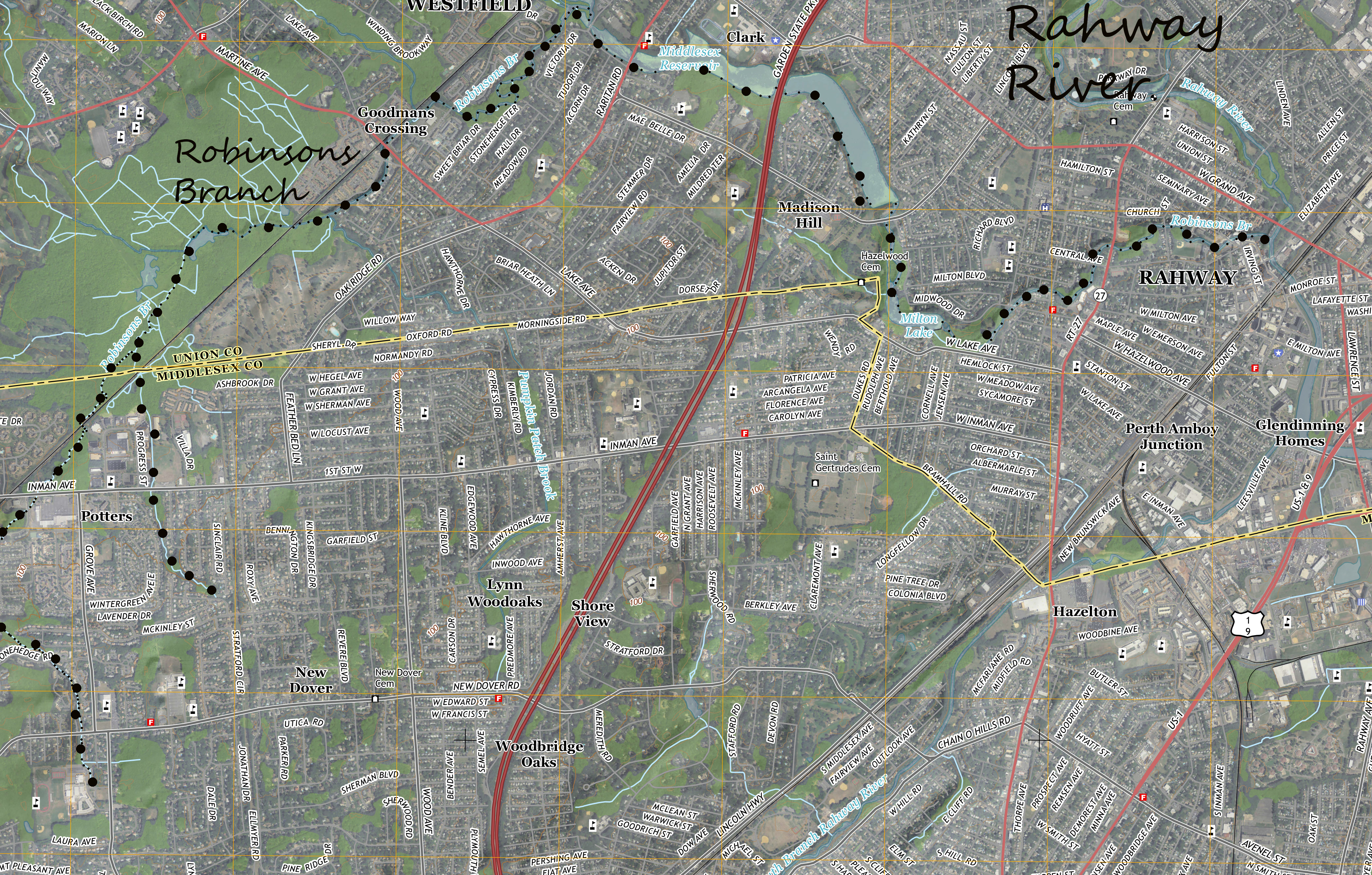
Course of Robinsons Branch

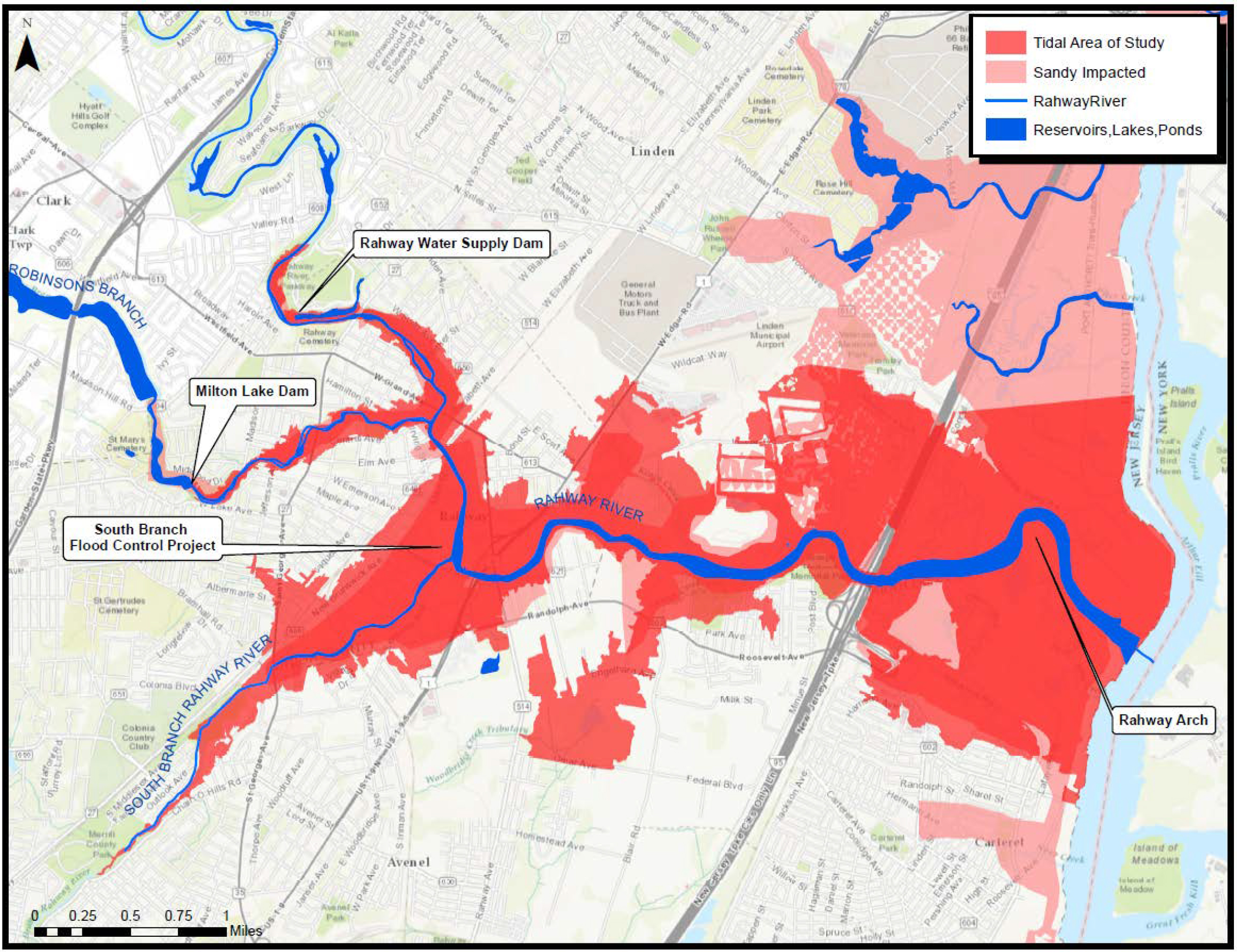
Flood plain of the Rahway River, including Robinsons Branch at left

Robinsons Branch is a tributary of the Rahway River in Union and Middlesex Counties, New Jersey, United States.

The headwaters of Robinsons Branch are in Fanwood, Plainfield and Edison, New Jersey. It flows through Scotch Plains, Westfield, Clark, and Rahway, emptying into the Rahway River approximately five miles above the Arthur Kill. The drainage area is 21.6 square miles, mainly in Union County. The river is impounded at Robinson's Branch Reservoir and Milton Lake, and tidal to Milton Lake Dam. At the confluence of Pumpkin Patch Brook with Robinsons Branch flooding is a frequent problem, exacerbated by densely developed land. Flooding is both fluvial and tidal.
