= Garwood Public Schools =

School district in Union County, New Jersey, US

- 400 Second Avenue Garwood, Union County, New Jersey, 07027

District information
- Grades: PreK to 8
- Superintendent: Jason Marx
- Business administrator: Bernadette Pinto
- Schools: 1

Students and staff
- Enrollment: 360 (as of 2022–23)
- Faculty: 31.6 FTEs
- Student–teacher ratio: 11.4:1

Other information
- District Factor Group: DE
- Website: www.garwoodschools.org
Ind.	Per pupil	District spending	Rank (*)	K-8 average	%± vs. average
1A	Total Spending	$17,631	26	$18,891	−6.7%
1	Budgetary Cost	11,125	7	14,159	−21.4%
2	Classroom Instruction	6,359	3	8,659	−26.6%
6	Support Services	1,487	10	2,167	−31.4%
8	Administrative Cost	1,476	19	1,547	−4.6%
10	Operations & Maintenance	1,661	27	1,612	3.0%
13	Extracurricular Activities	132	33	104	26.9%
16	Median Teacher Salary	58,814	39	61,136
Data from NJDoE 2014 Taxpayers' Guide to Education Spending. *Of K-8 districts with up to 400 students. Lowest spending=1; Highest=71

The Garwood Public Schools is a community public school district that serves students in pre-kindergarten through eighth grade from Garwood, in Union County, in the U.S. state of New Jersey.

As of the 2022–23 school year, the district, comprising one school, had an enrollment of 360 students and 31.6 classroom teachers (on an FTE basis), for a student–teacher ratio of 11.4:1.

Public school students in ninth through twelfth grades attend Arthur L. Johnson High School in neighboring Clark as part of a sending/receiving relationship with the Clark Public School District. As of the 2022–23 school year, the school had an enrollment of 884 students and 69.0 classroom teachers (on an FTE basis), for a student–teacher ratio of 12.8:1.

== History ==
Garwood had been a constituent municipality of the Union County Regional High School District, together with Berkeley Heights, Clark, Kenilworth, Mountainside and Springfield Township. Established in 1937, the dissolution of the district in 1997 left Garwood without its own high school, which resulted in the establishment of the sending relationship with the Clark Public School District.

The district had been classified by the New Jersey Department of Education as being in District Factor Group "DE", the fifth-highest of eight groupings. District Factor Groups organize districts statewide to allow comparison by common socioeconomic characteristics of the local districts. From lowest socioeconomic status to highest, the categories are A, B, CD, DE, FG, GH, I and J.

== Schools ==
Lincoln School served 354 students for pre-kindergarten to eighth grade in the 2022–23 school year.

- Mary Emmons, principal

== Administration ==
Core members of the district's administration are:

- Jason Marx, superintendent
- Bernadette Pinto, business administrator and board secretary

== Board of education ==
The district's board of education, comprised of nine members, sets policy and oversees the fiscal and educational operation of the district through its administration. As a Type II school district, the board's trustees are elected directly by voters to serve three-year terms of office on a staggered basis, with three seats up for election each year held (since 2012) as part of the November general election. The board appoints a superintendent to oversee the district's day-to-day operations and a business administrator to supervise the business functions of the district.
