= Garwood Lake =

- Location within Michigan
- Location: Berrien County, Michigan
- Coordinates: 41°47′43″N 86°28′27″W
- Type: lake
- Surface area: 10.84 acres (4.39 ha)

Garwood Lake is a lake in Berrien County, in the U.S. state of Michigan. The lake has a size of 10.84 acres (4.39 ha).

Garwood Lake was named after Samuel H. Garwood, a pioneer who settled in 1834 near the lake.
