= Clark Public School District =

School district in Union County, New Jersey, US

Address
- 365 Westfield Avenue Clark, Union County, New Jersey, 07066; United States
- Coordinates: 40.623114°N 74.311967°W

District information
- Grades: PreK-12
- Superintendent: Edward Grande
- Business administrator: R. Paul Vizzuso
- Schools: 5

Students and staff
- Enrollment: 2,299 (as of 2019–20)
- Faculty: 184.7 FTEs
- Student–teacher ratio: 12.4:1

Other information
- District Factor Group: FG
- Website: www.clarkschools.org
Ind.	Per pupil	District spending	Rank (*)	K-12 average	%± vs. average
1A	Total Spending	$16,050	11	$18,891	−15.0%
1	Budgetary Cost	12,801	18	14,783	−13.4%
2	Classroom Instruction	7,529	17	8,763	−14.1%
6	Support Services	2,022	31	2,392	−15.5%
8	Administrative Cost	1,433	21	1,485	−3.5%
10	Operations & Maintenance	1,368	14	1,783	−23.3%
13	Extracurricular Activities	430	46	268	60.4%
16	Median Teacher Salary	54,743	3	64,043
Data from NJDoE 2014 Taxpayers' Guide to Education Spending. *Of K-12 districts with 1,800-3,500 students. Lowest spending=1; Highest=68

The Clark Public School District is a comprehensive community public school district that serves students in pre-kindergarten through twelfth grade from Clark, in Union County, in the U.S. state of New Jersey. Students from Garwood, attend the district's high school as part of a sending/receiving relationship with the Garwood Public Schools.

As of the 2019–20 school year, the district, comprising five schools, had an enrollment of 2,299 students and 184.7 classroom teachers (on an FTE basis), for a student–teacher ratio of 12.4:1.

The district is classified by the New Jersey Department of Education as being in District Factor Group "FG", the fourth-highest of eight groupings. District Factor Groups organize districts statewide to allow comparison by common socioeconomic characteristics of the local districts. From lowest socioeconomic status to highest, the categories are A, B, CD, DE, FG, GH, I and J.

== History ==
The district's high school, originally named Arthur L. Johnson Regional High School, was constructed at a cost of $2 million by the Union County Regional High School District and included 94,000 square feet (8,700 m^{2}) of space for classes and other facilities, The school, which was named for a longtime county superintendent who was a leading advocate for regionalization, opened in December 1956.

Amid conflict between the constituent municipalities about financing a district described as "the highest-spending regional high school in the state" and anger from residents impacted by the closure of David Brearley High School, a referendum was held in May 1996 in which voters approved a proposal to breakup the regional district. With the district's dissolution at the end of the 1996-97 school year Arthur L. Johnson High School was turned over to the Clark Public School District, which became a K-12 district. Garwood, one of the two municipalities without a high school, established a sending/receiving relationship to send its high school students to Arthur L. Johnson.

== Schools ==
Schools in the district (with 2019–20 enrollment data from the National Center for Education Statistics) are:

Preschool

- Clark Preschool with 20 students in PreK

Elementary schools

- Frank K. Hehnly Elementary School with 551 students in grades K-5
  - Shirley Bergin, principal
- Valley Road Elementary School with 435 students in grades K-5
  - Joseph Beltramba, principal

Middle school

- Carl H. Kumpf Middle School with 518 students in grades 6-8
  - Amanda Clarke, principal

High school

- Arthur L. Johnson High School with 708 students in grades 9-12
  - Tara Oliveira, principal

== Administration ==
Core members of the district's administration are:

- Edward Grande, superintendent
- R. Paul Vizzuso, business administrator and board secretary

== Board of education ==
The district's board of education is comprised of nine members who set policy and oversee the fiscal and educational operation of the district through its administration; an additional board member represents the sending district of Garwood. As a Type II school district, the board's trustees are elected directly by voters to serve three-year terms of office on a staggered basis, with three seats up for election each year held (since 2012) as part of the November general election. The board appoints a superintendent to oversee the district's day-to-day operations and a business administrator to supervise the business functions of the district.
