= Len Garwood =

English footballer (1923–1979)

Personal information
- Full name: Leonard Frank Garwood
- Date of birth: 28 July 1923
- Place of birth: Ranikhet, British India
- Date of death: 16 July 1979 (aged 55)
- Place of death: Dunstable, England
- Position: Wing half

Senior career*
Years	Team	Apps	(Gls)
?–1946	Hitchin Town		
1946–1952	Tottenham Hotspur	2	(0)
1952–1959	Bedford Town		
1954	Toronto Ulster United		
- * Club domestic league appearances and goals

Leonard Frank Garwood (28 July 1923 – 1979) was an English professional footballer who played for Hitchin Town, Tottenham Hotspur and Bedford Town.

== Playing career ==
Garwood played non-league football for Eton Bray, Cambridge Town and Hitchin Town before signing amateur forms for Tottenham Hotspur in 1944. The wing half made his debut in a war time league match against Coventry City in 1946 and signed part-time professional forms soon after. He made his senior debut on 23 October 1948 and featured in two matches and made over 200 appearances in reserve and A fixtures. In August 1952 he joined Bedford Town where he played for a further seven years. In the summer of 1954, he played in the National Soccer League with Toronto Ulster United.

== Biography ==
Garwood was born in India where his father was serving with the Armed forces. He later trained as toolmaker and was employed by Waterlow and Sons of Dunstable. Outside of football Garwood was a keen cricketer and turned out for Eton Bray. Garwood died on 16 July 1979 at Dunstable.
