= Walter Garwood =

New Zealand cricketer

Personal information
- Full name: Walter John Garwood
- Born: 30 April 1849; Tortington, Sussex, England
- Died: 10 April 1885 (aged 35); Brisbane, Australia

Domestic team information
- Years: Team
- 1873/74: Otago
- 1876/77: Wellington
- Source: Cricinfo, 11 May 2016

Walter John Garwood (30 April 1849 – 10 April 1885) was a New Zealand cricketer. He played two first-class matches, one for Otago during the 1873–74 season and the other for Wellington in 1876–77.

Garwood was the highest scorer on either side in his first first-class match, scoring 31 in the first innings for Otago against Auckland when no one else in the match reached 20. Garwood was born in England and worked as a miner. He died of tuberculosis at Brisbane Hospital in 1885 aged 36.
