= Phil Garwood =

Australian rules footballer

Personal information
- Full name: Phil Garwood
- Born: 24 December 1939
- Died: 18 August 2011 (aged 71)
- Original team: Launceston
- Height: 184 cm (6 ft 0 in)
- Weight: 80 kg (176 lb)

Playing career^{1}
Years	Club	Games (Goals)
1964–65	Hawthorn	13 (0)
- ^{1} Playing statistics correct to the end of 1965.

Phil Garwood (24 December 1939 – 18 August 2011) was an Australian rules footballer who played with Hawthorn in the Victorian Football League (VFL).
