= Haley Elizabeth Garwood =

American novelist (born 1940)

- Born: April 25, 1940 (age 86)
- Occupation: Novelist

Haley Elizabeth Garwood (born April 25, 1940) is an American historical novelist. She has worked as an airline stewardess and as a teacher of special education students. She also teaches literature at university.

After her retirement as a high school principal in West Virginia, she began to write full-time. Garwood began her "Warrior Queen Series" with the book, The Forgotten Queen (1998). The series focuses on "forgotten women in history." She has four completed novels in her Warrior Queen Series about women warriors. After Rani of Jhansi, she will be searching for an "African Queen" series.

== Publications ==
=== Warrior Queen series ===
1. The Forgotten Queen (1998)
2. Swords Across the Thames (1999)
3. Ashes of Britannia (2001)
4. Zenobia (2005)
5. Rani of Jhansi (2007)
