= Garwood, New Jersey =

Borough in Union County, New Jersey, US

- Borough
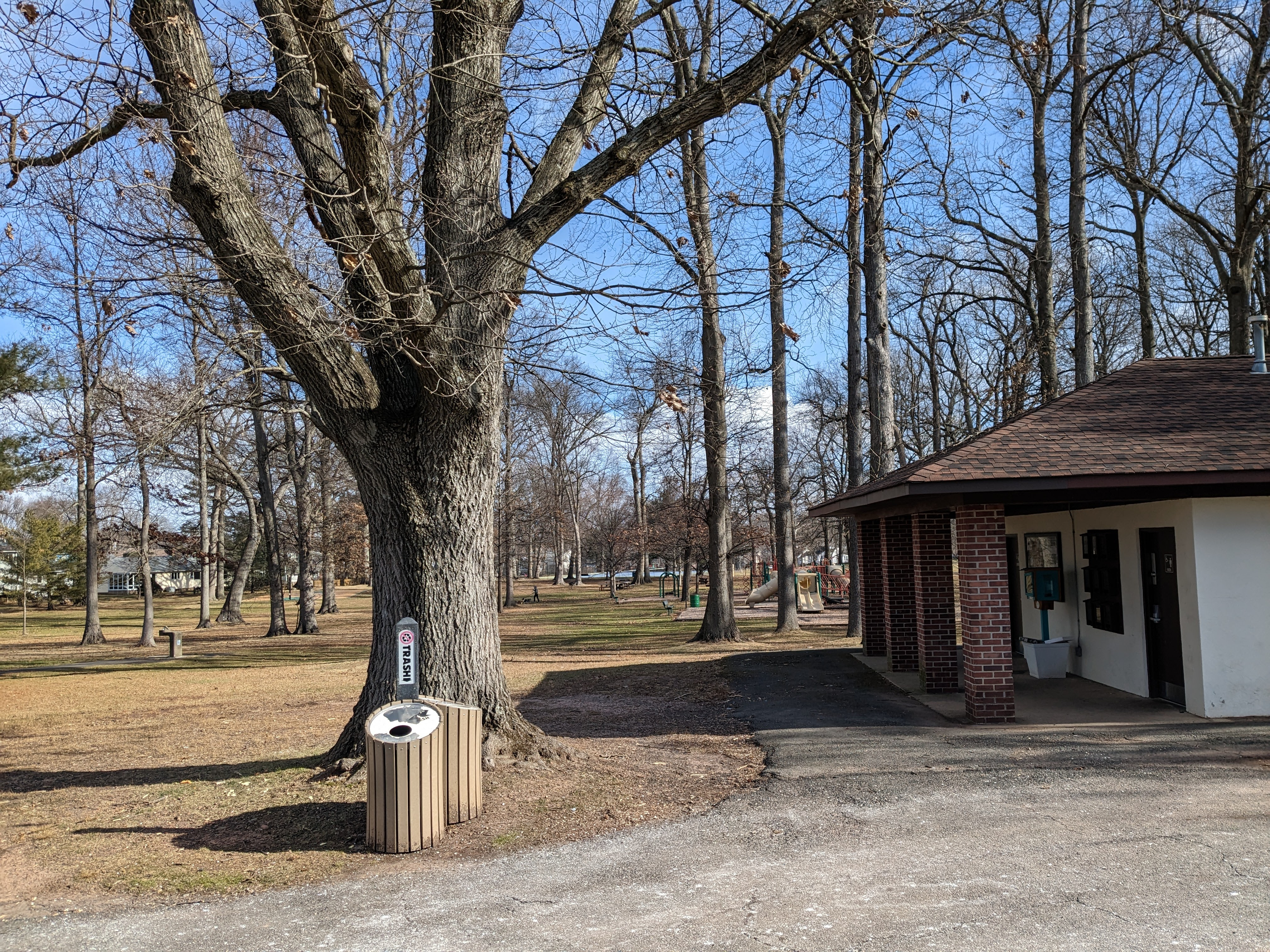
- Unami Park in Garwood

- Flag Seal

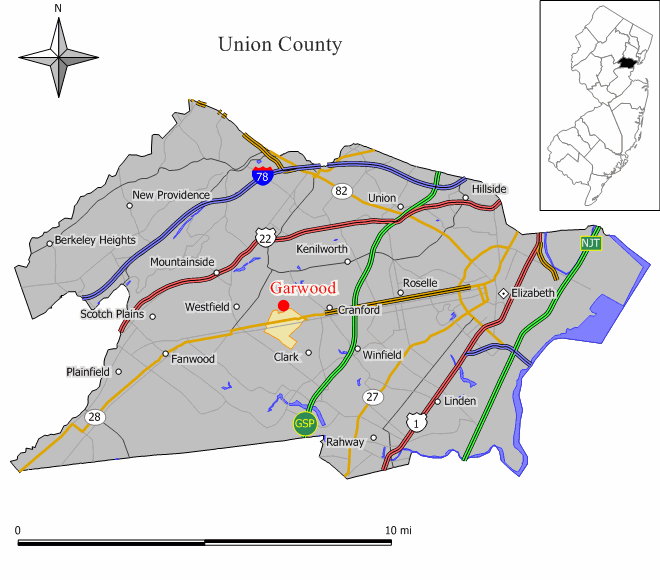
- Location of Garwood in Union County highlighted in yellow (left). Inset map: Location of Union County in New Jersey highlighted in black (right).

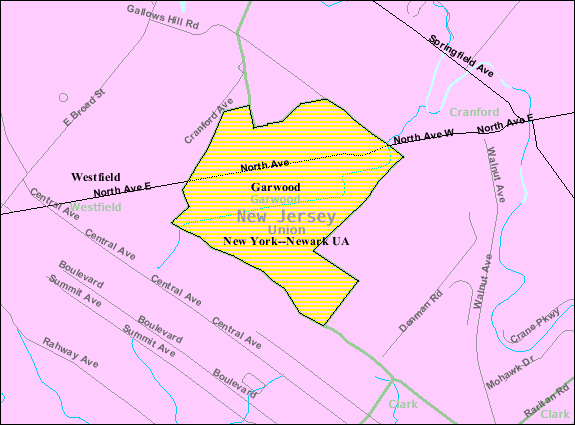
- Census Bureau map of Garwood, New Jersey

- Location in Union County Location in New Jersey Location in the United States
- Coordinates: 40.651331°N 74.323152°W
- Country: United States
- State: New Jersey
- County: Union
- Incorporated: March 19, 1903

Government
  - Type: Borough
  - Body: Borough Council
  - Mayor: Jen Blumenstock (D, December 21, 2023)
  - Administrator: John Arthur
  - Clerk: Nicole Kotiga

Area
  - Total: 0.65 sq mi (1.68 km^{2})
  - Land: 0.65 sq mi (1.68 km^{2})
  - Water: 0 sq mi (0.00 km^{2}) 0.00%
  - Rank: 532nd of 565 in state 20th of 21 in county
- Elevation: 82 ft (25 m)

Population (2020)
  - Total: 4,454
  - Estimate (2024): 5,346
  - Rank: 397th of 565 in state 20th of 21 in county
  - Density: 6,848.2/sq mi (2,644.1/km^{2})
  - Rank: 69th of 565 in state 8th of 21 in county
- Time zone: UTC−05:00 (Eastern (EST))
  - Summer (DST): UTC−04:00 (Eastern (EDT))
- ZIP Code: 07027
- Area code: 908
- FIPS code: 3403925800
- GNIS feature ID: 0885229
- Website: garwood.org

Garwood is a borough in Union County, in the U.S. state of New Jersey. As of the 2020 United States census, the borough's population was 4,454, an increase of 228 (+5.4%) from the 2010 census count of 4,226, which in turn reflected an increase of 73 (+1.8%) from the 4,153 counted in the 2000 census.

== History ==
Garwood was incorporated as a borough on March 19, 1903, from portions of Cranford and Westfield Town.

Garwood developed in the late 19th century as an industrial and residential community between Cranford and Westfield. Its growth was closely tied to the Jersey Central Railroad and local manufacturers including Hall Signal Company, Hercules Tube Works, and the Aeolian Company. The borough was named for Samuel Garwood, president of a railroad-affiliated land company.

Dissatisfaction with municipal services provided by Cranford and Westfield led residents to seek local self-government. Disputes over roads, fire protection, policing, and schools fueled the movement. In 1903, it became an independent borough after approval by the New Jersey Legislature despite opposition from Cranford. Following incorporation, the borough established its own institutions, including Jefferson School and its first municipal building, completed in 1915.

The Westwood event venue opened in the early 1900s as Britz's Garwood Hotel, and was later known as Scandia Hall.

== Geography ==
According to the United States Census Bureau, the borough had a total area of 0.65 square miles (1.68 km^{2}), all of which was land.

The borough is roughly bisected by the tracks of NJ Transit's Raritan Valley Line, originally built as part of the Jersey Central railroad. On the north side of the railroad, most of the streets are numbered, while on the south side of Garwood most of the streets are named after trees.

Garwood borders the Union County municipalities of Cranford and Westfield.

== Demographics ==
Historical population
Census	Pop.	Note	%±
1910	1,118		—
1920	2,084		86.4%
1930	3,344		60.5%
1940	3,622		8.3%
1950	4,622		27.6%
1960	5,426		17.4%
1970	5,260		−3.1%
1980	4,752		−9.7%
1990	4,227		−11.0%
2000	4,153		−1.8%
2010	4,226		1.8%
2020	4,454		5.4%
2024 (est.)	5,346	▲	20.0%
Population sources: 1910–1920 1900–1910; 1910–1930 1940–2000; 2000 2010 2020

=== Racial and ethnic composition ===
Garwood borough, New Jersey – Racial and ethnic composition Note: the US Census treats Hispanic/Latino as an ethnic category. This table excludes Latinos from the racial categories and assigns them to a separate category. Hispanics/Latinos may be of any race.
Race / Ethnicity (NH = Non-Hispanic)	Pop 2000	Pop 2010	Pop 2020	% 2000	% 2010	% 2020
White alone (NH)	3,851	3,666	3,436	92.73%	86.75%	77.14%
Black or African American alone (NH)	15	42	69	0.36%	0.99%	1.55%
Native American or Alaska Native alone (NH)	0	1	1	0.00%	0.02%	0.02%
Asian alone (NH)	55	86	119	1.32%	2.04%	2.67%
Native Hawaiian or Pacific Islander alone (NH)	0	0	0	0.00%	0.00%	0.00%
Other race alone (NH)	1	17	32	0.02%	0.40%	0.72%
Mixed race or Multiracial (NH)	24	41	127	0.58%	0.97%	2.85%
Hispanic or Latino (any race)	207	373	670	4.98%	8.83%	15.04%
Total	4,153	4,226	4,454	100.00%	100.00%	100.00%

=== 2020 census ===
As of the 2020 census, Garwood had a population of 4,454. The median age was 42.5 years. 17.8% of residents were under the age of 18 and 18.1% of residents were 65 years of age or older. For every 100 females there were 91.2 males, and for every 100 females age 18 and over there were 87.3 males.

100.0% of residents lived in urban areas, while 0.0% lived in rural areas.

There were 1,920 households in Garwood, of which 27.3% had children under the age of 18 living in them. Of all households, 45.2% were married-couple households, 18.0% were households with a male householder and no spouse or partner present, and 29.6% were households with a female householder and no spouse or partner present. About 29.3% of all households were made up of individuals and 13.7% had someone living alone who was 65 years of age or older.

There were 2,016 housing units, of which 4.8% were vacant. The homeowner vacancy rate was 1.3% and the rental vacancy rate was 3.6%.

=== 2010 census ===
The 2010 United States census counted 4,226 people, 1,778 households, and 1,118 families in the borough. The population density was 6,362.7 per square mile (2,456.7/km^{2}). There were 1,870 housing units at an average density of 2,815.5 per square mile (1,087.1/km^{2}). The racial makeup was 93.23% (3,940) White, 1.06% (45) Black or African American, 0.02% (1) Native American, 2.04% (86) Asian, 0.00% (0) Pacific Islander, 1.80% (76) from other races, and 1.85% (78) from two or more races. Hispanic or Latino of any race were 8.83% (373) of the population.

Of the 1,778 households, 23.9% had children under the age of 18; 47.5% were married couples living together; 10.7% had a female householder with no husband present and 37.1% were non-families. Of all households, 29.9% were made up of individuals and 10.6% had someone living alone who was 65 years of age or older. The average household size was 2.38 and the average family size was 3.00.

19.3% of the population were under the age of 18, 6.4% from 18 to 24, 30.4% from 25 to 44, 28.7% from 45 to 64, and 15.2% who were 65 years of age or older. The median age was 41.4 years. For every 100 females, the population had 93.9 males. For every 100 females ages 18 and older there were 92.3 males.

The Census Bureau's 2006–2010 American Community Survey showed that (in 2010 inflation-adjusted dollars) median household income was $72,254 (with a margin of error of +/− $9,274) and the median family income was $86,959 (+/− $8,603). Males had a median income of $58,258 (+/− $3,197) versus $43,455 (+/− $3,625) for females. The per capita income for the borough was $35,753 (+/− $2,821). About 0.9% of families and 1.8% of the population were below the poverty line, including none of those under age 18 and none of those age 65 or over.

=== 2000 census ===
As of the 2000 United States census there were 4,153 people, 1,731 households, and 1,125 families residing in the borough. The population density was 6,292.9 inhabitants per square mile (2,429.7/km^{2}). There were 1,782 housing units at an average density of 2,700.2 per square mile (1,042.6/km^{2}). The racial makeup of the borough was 95.91% White, 0.36% African American, 1.32% Asian, 1.54% from other races, and 0.87% from two or more races. Hispanic or Latino of any race were 4.98% of the population.

There were 1,731 households, out of which 26.2% had children under the age of 18 living with them, 49.0% were married couples living together, 12.1% had a female householder with no husband present, and 35.0% were non-families. 28.7% of all households were made up of individuals, and 11.5% had someone living alone who was 65 years of age or older. The average household size was 2.40 and the average family size was 2.96.

In the borough the population was spread out, with 20.0% under the age of 18, 6.3% from 18 to 24, 35.6% from 25 to 44, 20.9% from 45 to 64, and 17.2% who were 65 years of age or older. The median age was 38 years. For every 100 females, there were 93.3 males. For every 100 females age 18 and over, there were 89.6 males.

The median income for a household in the borough was $52,571, and the median income for a family was $64,053. Males had a median income of $50,951 versus $36,538 for females. The per capita income for the borough was $26,944. About 3.5% of families and 5.1% of the population were below the poverty line, including 6.3% of those under age 18 and 6.4% of those age 65 or over.

== Government ==
=== Local government ===
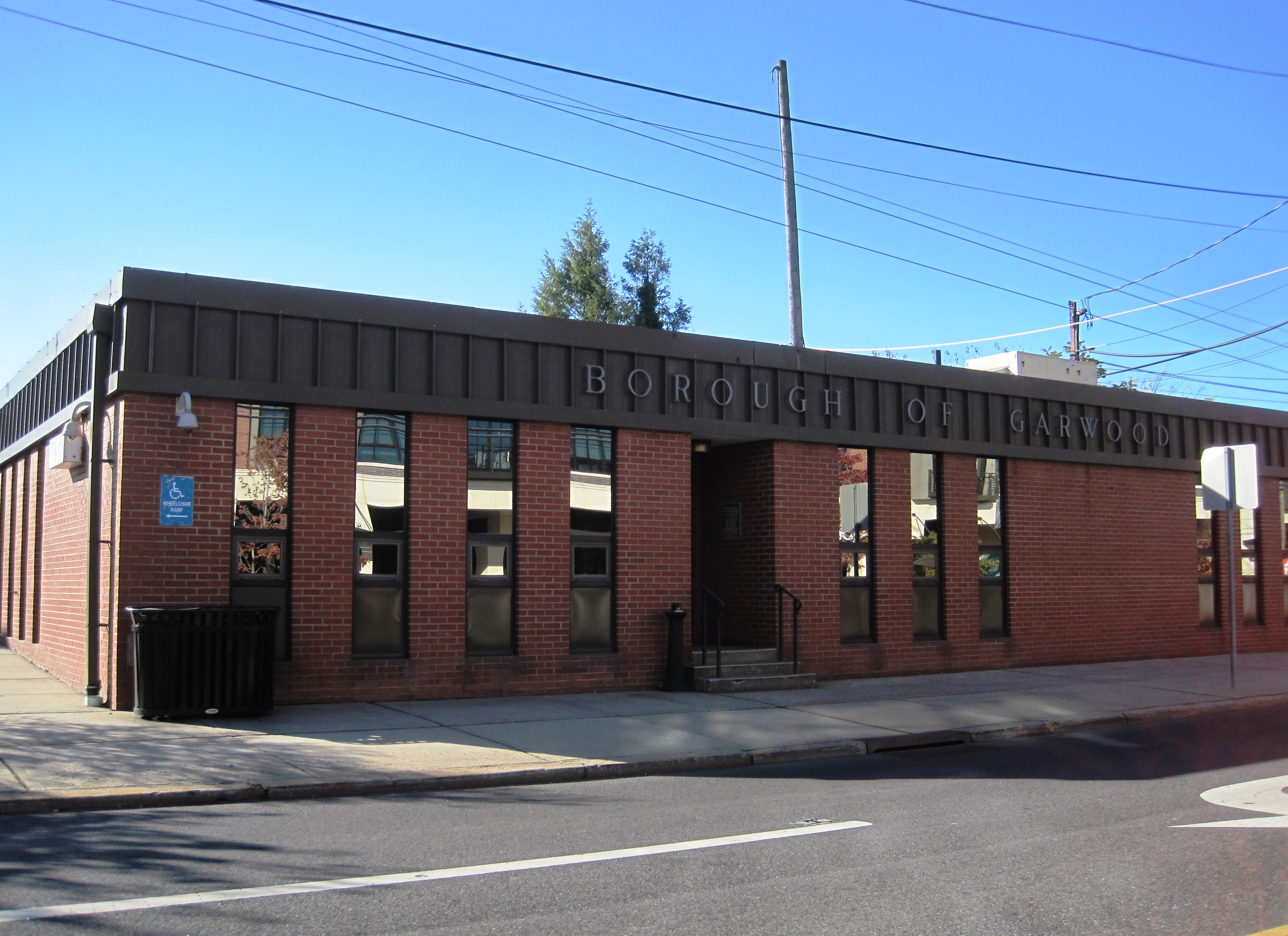
Garwood Municipal Building

Garwood is governed under the borough form of New Jersey municipal government, which is used in 218 municipalities (of the 564) statewide, making it the most common form of government in New Jersey. The governing body is comprised of the mayor and the borough council, with all positions elected at-large on a partisan basis as part of the November general election. The mayor is elected directly by the voters to a four-year term of office. The borough council includes six members elected to serve three-year terms on a staggered basis, with two seats coming up for election each year in a three-year cycle. The borough form of government used by Garwood is a "weak mayor / strong council" government in which council members act as the legislative body with the mayor presiding at meetings and voting only in the event of a tie. The mayor can veto ordinances subject to an override by a two-thirds majority vote of the council. The mayor makes committee and liaison assignments for council members, and most appointments are made by the mayor with the advice and consent of the council.

As of 2026, the mayor of Garwood is Democrat Jen Blumenstock, whose term of office ends December 31, 2026. Members of the Garwood Borough Council are Council President Karina Boto (D, 2026), Kathleen Annarelli (D, 2028), Stephanie Bianco (D, appointed to an unexpired term ending 2027), Clarissa Nolde (D, 2028), Chase Padusniak (D, 2027), and Hursh Sureka (D, appointed to an unexpired term ending 2026).

The Borough Administrator is John Arthur. The Borough Clerk is Nicole Kotiga.

=== Federal, state, and county representation ===
Garwood is located in the 10th Congressional District and is part of New Jersey's 21st state legislative district.

For the 119th United States Congress, New Jersey's 10th congressional district is represented by LaMonica McIver (D, Newark). New Jersey is represented in the United States Senate by Democrats Cory Booker (Newark, term ends 2027) and Andy Kim (Moorestown, term ends 2031).

For the 2026–2027 session, the 21st legislative district of the New Jersey Legislature is represented in the State Senate by Jon Bramnick (R, Westfield) and in the General Assembly by Vincent Kearney (D, Garwood) and Andrew Macurdy (D, Summit).

Union County is governed by a Board of County Commissioners, whose nine members are elected at-large to three-year terms of office on a staggered basis with three seats coming up for election each year, with an appointed County Manager overseeing the day-to-day operations of the county. At an annual reorganization meeting held in the beginning of January, the board selects a Chair and Vice Chair from among its members. As of 2026, Union County's County Commissioners are:

Vice Chair Rebecca Williams (D, Plainfield, 2028), Chairman Joesph Bodek (D, Linden, 2026), James E. Baker Jr. (D, Rahway, 2027), Michele Delisfort (D, Union Township, 2026), Lourdes M. Leon (D, Elizabeth, 2026), Alexander Mirabella (D, Fanwood, 2027) Kimberly Palmieri-Mouded (D, Westfield, 2027). Stanley J. Neron (D, Elizabeth, 2028), Joseph Signorello III (D, Roselle Park, 2028)

Constitutional officers elected on a countywide basis are: Clerk Vacant - Incumbent Clerk Joanne Rajoppi (D, Union Township) died on July 16, 2026. Her death triggered a special election for a full five-year term to be held concurrently with the November 2026 general election. Deputy Clerk Clara Fernández assumes the powers of the office until the vacancy is filled. Sheriff Peter Corvelli (D, Kenilworth, 2026) and Surrogate Christopher E. Hudak (D, Clark, 2027).

=== Politics ===
As of March 2011, there were a total of 2,685 registered voters in Garwood, of which 796 (29.6% vs. 41.8% countywide) were registered as Democrats, 496 (18.5% vs. 15.3%) were registered as Republicans and 1,393 (51.9% vs. 42.9%) were registered as Unaffiliated. There were no voters registered to other parties. Among the borough's 2010 Census population, 63.5% (vs. 53.3% in Union County) were registered to vote, including 78.7% of those ages 18 and over (vs. 70.6% countywide).

United States presidential election results for Garwood
Year	Republican		Democratic		Third party(ies)	
Year	No.	%	No.	%	No.	%
2024	1,323	48.27%	1,324	48.30%	94	3.43%
2020	1,231	47.06%	1,302	49.77%	83	3.17%
2016	1,130	48.41%	1,026	43.96%	178	7.63%
2012	957	48.46%	968	49.01%	50	2.53%
2008	1,090	51.39%	971	45.78%	60	2.83%
2004	995	50.13%	928	46.75%	62	3.12%

In the 2012 presidential election, Democrat Barack Obama received 968 votes (48.8% vs. 66.0% countywide), ahead of Republican Mitt Romney with 957 votes (48.2% vs. 32.3%) and other candidates with 38 votes (1.9% vs. 0.8%), among the 1,985 ballots cast by the borough's 2,812 registered voters, for a turnout of 70.6% (vs. 68.8% in Union County). In the 2008 presidential election, Republican John McCain received 1,090 votes (51.6% vs. 35.2% countywide), ahead of Democrat Barack Obama with 971 votes (46.0% vs. 63.1%) and other candidates with 31 votes (1.5% vs. 0.9%), among the 2,111 ballots cast by the borough's 2,782 registered voters, for a turnout of 75.9% (vs. 74.7% in Union County). In the 2004 presidential election, Republican George W. Bush received 995 votes (50.5% vs. 40.3% countywide), ahead of Democrat John Kerry with 928 votes (47.1% vs. 58.3%) and other candidates with 30 votes (1.5% vs. 0.7%), among the 1,970 ballots cast by the borough's 2,539 registered voters, for a turnout of 77.6% (vs. 72.3% in the whole county).

Gubernatorial election results for Garwood
Year	Republican		Democratic		Third party(ies)	
Year	No.	%	No.	%	No.	%
2025	1,011	46.23%	1,168	53.41%	8	0.37%
2021	916	53.63%	772	45.20%	20	1.17%
2017	654	46.61%	698	49.75%	51	3.64%
2013	802	64.11%	429	34.29%	20	1.60%
2009	823	56.96%	477	33.01%	145	10.03%
2005	673	50.91%	593	44.86%	56	4.24%

In the 2017 gubernatorial election, Democrat Phil Murphy received 698 votes (49.8% vs. 65.2% countywide), ahead of Republican Kim Guadagno with 654 votes (46.6% vs. 32.6%), and other candidates with 51 votes (3.6% vs. 2.1%), among the 1,466 ballots cast by the borough's 3,007 registered voters, for a turnout of 48.8%. In the 2013 gubernatorial election, Republican Chris Christie received 64.1% of the vote (802 cast), ahead of Democrat Barbara Buono with 34.3% (429 votes), and other candidates with 1.6% (20 votes), among the 1,297 ballots cast by the borough's 2,763 registered voters (46 ballots were spoiled), for a turnout of 46.9%. In the 2009 gubernatorial election, Republican Chris Christie received 823 votes (56.4% vs. 41.7% countywide), ahead of Democrat Jon Corzine with 477 votes (32.7% vs. 50.6%), Independent Chris Daggett with 127 votes (8.7% vs. 5.9%) and other candidates with 18 votes (1.2% vs. 0.8%), among the 1,460 ballots cast by the borough's 2,681 registered voters, yielding a 54.5% turnout (vs. 46.5% in the county).

United States Senate election results for Garwood1
Year	Republican		Democratic		Third party(ies)	
Year	No.	%	No.	%	No.	%
2024	1,204	47.66%	1,280	50.67%	42	1.66%
2018	886	48.90%	813	44.87%	113	6.24%
2012	851	48.32%	880	49.97%	30	1.70%
2006	685	51.54%	596	44.85%	48	3.61%

United States Senate election results for Garwood2
Year	Republican		Democratic		Third party(ies)	
Year	No.	%	No.	%	No.	%
2020	1,179	46.92%	1,293	51.45%	41	1.63%
2014	602	50.00%	579	48.09%	23	1.91%
2013	430	55.13%	347	44.49%	3	0.38%
2008	958	51.42%	862	46.27%	43	2.31%

== Emergency services ==
=== Police ===
Garwood's primary law enforcement is the borough's police department, serving the borough since its establishment in 1906. The Garwood Police Department is a small force consisting of Chief of Police Jonathan Pride, one captain, two lieutenants, two sergeants, ten patrolmen, and four civilian dispatchers. Patrol operations normally consist of one north side car, one south side car, and one supervisor. Officers work 12-hour shifts, four days on, four days off, alternating between days and nights.

=== EMS ===
Garwood First Aid Squad serves as the emergency medical service in town. Founded in 1939, it is non-profit service, consists of a dedicated all volunteer staff serving the borough 24 hours per day, seven days a week, at no cost to the residents. Drivers and EMTs on the squad also answer calls for mutual aid when an ambulance is needed in other towns where one is not available. GFAS answers anywhere from 350 to 400 calls annually.

=== Fire ===
Garwood Fire Department is entirely volunteer, and serves the borough in the capacity of fire protection, fire prevention, and fire code enforcement. The fire chief is John Scalzadonna.

== Education ==
The Garwood Public Schools serves students in pre-kindergarten through eighth grade at Lincoln School. As of the 2022–23 school year, the district, comprised of one school, had an enrollment of 360 students and 31.6 classroom teachers (on an FTE basis), for a student–teacher ratio of 11.4:1.

Public school students in ninth through twelfth grades attend Arthur L. Johnson High School in neighboring Clark as part of a sending/receiving relationship with the Clark Public School District. As of the 2022–23 school year, the school had an enrollment of 884 students and 69.0 classroom teachers (on an FTE basis), for a student–teacher ratio of 12.8:1.

Students from Garwood, and all of Union County, are eligible to attend one of the Union County Vocational Technical Schools.

== Arts and culture ==
Garwood is home to the independent live music venue Crossroads. Garwood was once home to the Aeolian Company, once the world's largest musical-instrument making firm. Its remaining castle-like edifice is undergoing conversion to apartments by the Wilf family following a dispute with the township under the Mount Laurel doctrine for affordable housing.

== Residential development ==
Beginning in the late 2000s, Garwood pursued the redevelopment of former industrial properties and areas near its railroad station, emphasizing transit-oriented development. A revised master plan adopted in 2009 encouraged a mix of residential and commercial uses near the station.

Several residential developments were subsequently completed:

- The Pointe: A 44-unit age-restricted townhome condominium community developed in 2006–2007.
- The Lofts at Garwood: A 59-unit apartment development with ground-floor retail at North Avenue and Chestnut Street. Completed in 2010, it was among the borough's early transit-oriented redevelopment projects.
- The Village at Garwood: An affordable senior housing development that opened in June 2015. The 72-unit development consists of 71 apartments and a superintendent's unit.
- Vermella at Garwood Station: A mixed-use development by Russo Development on South Avenue, built on the former Casale Industries property. Its first phase, completed in 2022, includes 296 apartments and approximately 19,500 square feet of retail space. A second phase added 73 apartments across South Avenue.

A further redevelopment is planned for the former Garwood Paperboard property at 75 North Avenue by Garden Homes. The site was originally occupied by a factory built for the Aeolian Company, a manufacturer of pianos and organs, with manufacturing operations transferred to Garwood around 1900. The factory later became the Garwood Paperboard plant. Most of the industrial buildings were slated for demolition, but the redevelopment plan called for preserving a portion of the main factory's facade, locally known as the "Castle." The surviving section was constructed in the Gothic Revival style and was designated for incorporation into the new development. The borough's amended redevelopment plan provides for 212 residential units, including 88 age-restricted units and 37 affordable units. The borough reached a revised agreement with the developer in 2026.

== Houses of worship ==
=== St. Anne’s Church ===
St. Anne’s Church is a Roman Catholic parish in Garwood, part of the Roman Catholic Archdiocese of Newark. Founded in 1926, it originated from a local Catholic club and was initially affiliated with St. Michael’s Parish in Cranford. It offers Mass and parish activities. It is affiliated with the Roman Catholic Archdiocese of Newark and is named for St. Anne, the saint and mother of the Virgin Mary.

A parish school opened in 1951 after construction began in 1950, and was staffed by the Bernadine Sisters of St. Francis. In 2014, the former school and rectory were demolished and replaced by a senior housing development known as The Village at Garwood.

== Transportation ==
=== Roads and highways ===
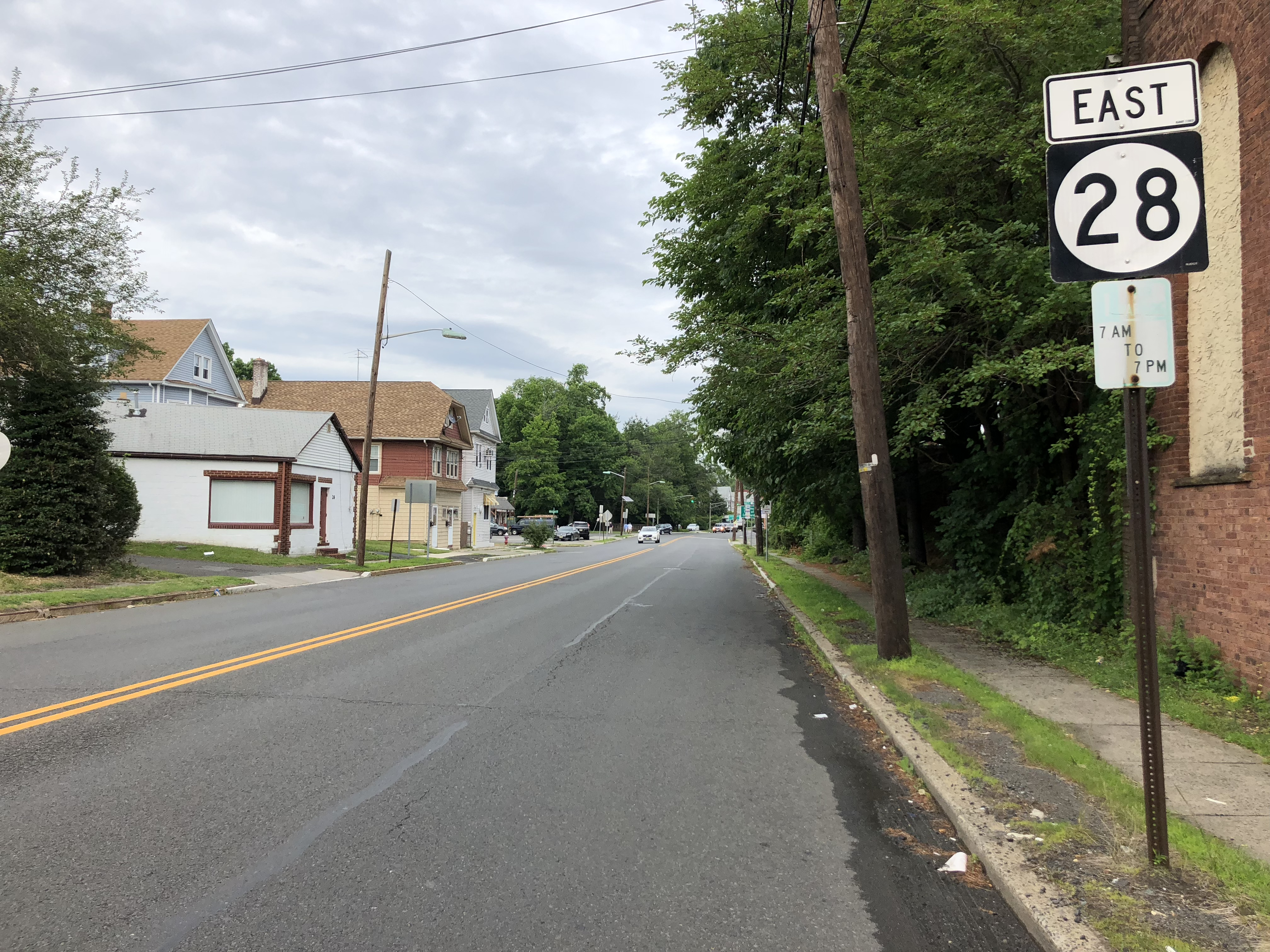
Route 28 eastbound in Garwood

As of May 2010, the borough had a total of 13.88 miles (22.34 km) of roadways, of which 11.90 miles (19.15 km) were maintained by the municipality, 1.02 miles (1.64 km) by Union County and 0.96 miles (1.54 km) by the New Jersey Department of Transportation.

Route 28 is the main highway through Garwood, connecting east to Cranford and west to Westfield. Route 59, which borders Cranford to the east, has been described as the shortest four-lane paved highway in the United States. It was built in the late 1920s, numbered Route 22 at the time and was originally planned to run from Fairfield Township to Rahway, but was never completed. Its total length is 792 feet (241 m).

=== Public transportation to Manhattan ===
Public transportation between Garwood and New York City is available through several options:

- Rail: Garwood station is served by the Raritan Valley Line. Weekday peak-hour passengers generally transfer at Newark Penn Station for connections to New York Penn Station. Some weekday off-peak trains provide direct, one-seat service to Manhattan, with scheduled journey times of approximately 43–46 minutes. The timetable also includes direct service to Hoboken Terminal.
- Bus: NJ Transit operates routes 113 and 59, serving the Port Authority Bus Terminal in Midtown Manhattan. The 113X express service takes approximately 45 minutes, while local bus service takes approximately 60 minutes.
- Private commuter bus: Boxcar (bus company) provides commuter service between Garwood and New York City, with approximately 45-minute intervals during the morning peak period and 60-minute intervals for evening return service.

=== Additional transportation ===
NJ Transit route 59 also serves Garwood, providing connections to Newark and other communities in Union County.

Newark Liberty International Airport is approximately 15 minutes away. Linden Airport, a general aviation facility is in nearby Linden, New Jersey.

== Notable people ==
People who were born in, residents of, or otherwise closely associated with Garwood include:

- David Durante (born 1980), national men's gymnastics champion
- Vincent Kearney, politician who has been a Garwood councilmember and is representative-elect of the New Jersey General Assembly's 21st district
- Barry Lubin (born 1952), creator of the clown character "Grandma" of the Big Apple Circus
- John J. McCarthy (1927–2001), politician who served in the New Jersey General Assembly and as Mayor of Garwood
- Tom Perrotta (born 1961), author
- LoreeJon Ogonowski-Brown (born 1965), professional pool player
- David Joseph Weeks (born 1944), neuropsychologist, educator and author best known for his study of eccentricity
