= Clark, New Jersey =

Township in Union County, New Jersey, US

- Township
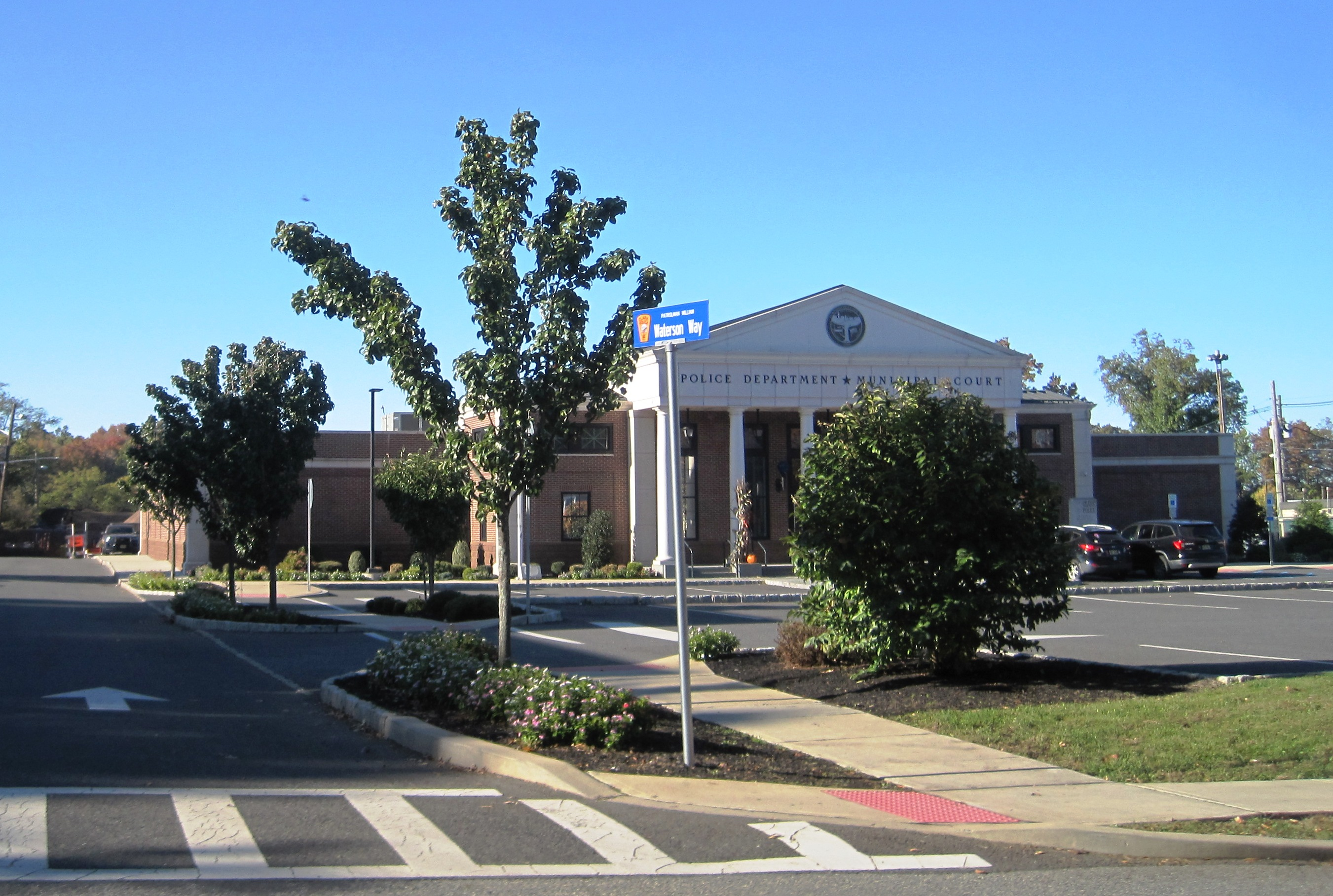
- Clark Police Department and Municipal Court building

- Seal
- Motto: Growth, Industry, History
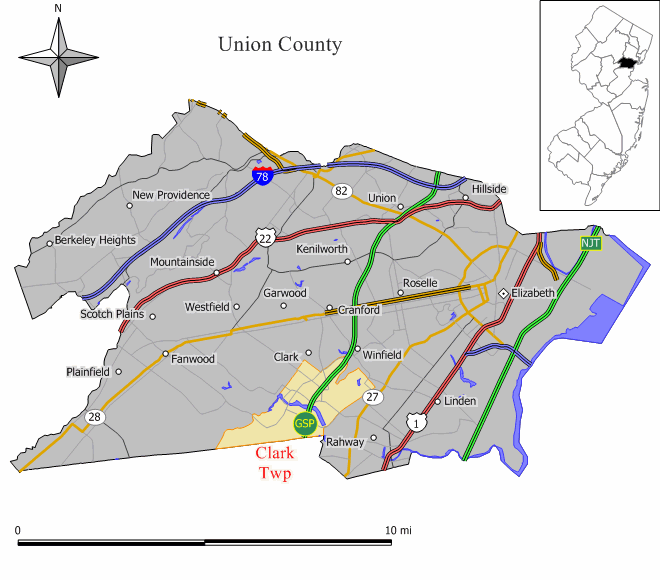
- Location of Clark in Union County highlighted in yellow (left). Inset map: Location of Union County in New Jersey highlighted in black (right).

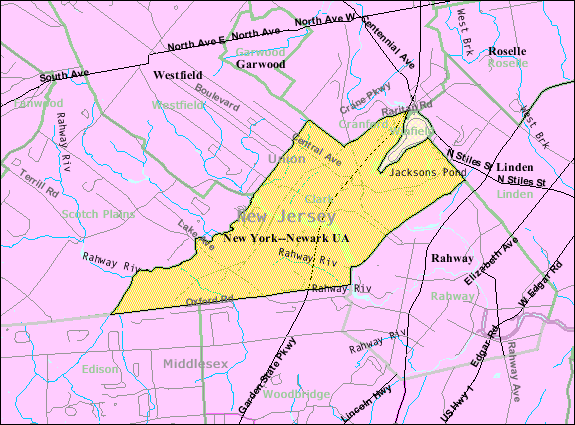
- Census Bureau map of Clark, New Jersey
- Interactive map of Clark, New Jersey
- Location in Union County Location in New Jersey Location in the United States
- Coordinates: 40.626°N 74.314°W
- Country: United States
- State: New Jersey
- County: Union
- Incorporated: March 23, 1864
- Named for: Abraham Clark

Government
  - Type: Faulkner Act Mayor-Council
  - Body: Township Council
  - Acting Mayor: Angel Albanese (R, term ends December 31, 2028)
  - Administrator: Jim Ulrich
  - Municipal clerk: Edie Merkel

Area
  - Total: 4.45 sq mi (11.53 km^{2})
  - Land: 4.27 sq mi (11.07 km^{2})
  - Water: 0.18 sq mi (0.47 km^{2}) 4.04%
  - Rank: 283rd of 565 in state 11th of 21 in county
- Elevation: 39 ft (12 m)

Population (2020)
  - Total: 15,544
  - Estimate (2023): 15,431
  - Rank: 167th of 565 in state 13th of 21 in county
  - Density: 3,637.7/sq mi (1,404.5/km^{2})
  - Rank: 184th of 565 in state 17th of 21 in county
- Time zone: UTC−05:00 (Eastern (EST))
  - Summer (DST): UTC−04:00 (Eastern (EDT))
- ZIP Code: 07066
- Area codes: 732/848
- FIPS code: 3403913150
- GNIS feature ID: 0882216
- Website: www.ourclark.com

Clark is a township in southern Union County, in the U.S. state of New Jersey. As of the 2020 United States census, the township's population was 15,544, an increase of 788 (+5.3%) from the 2010 census count of 14,756, which in turn reflected an increase of 159 (+1.1%) from the 14,597 counted in the 2000 census.

== History ==
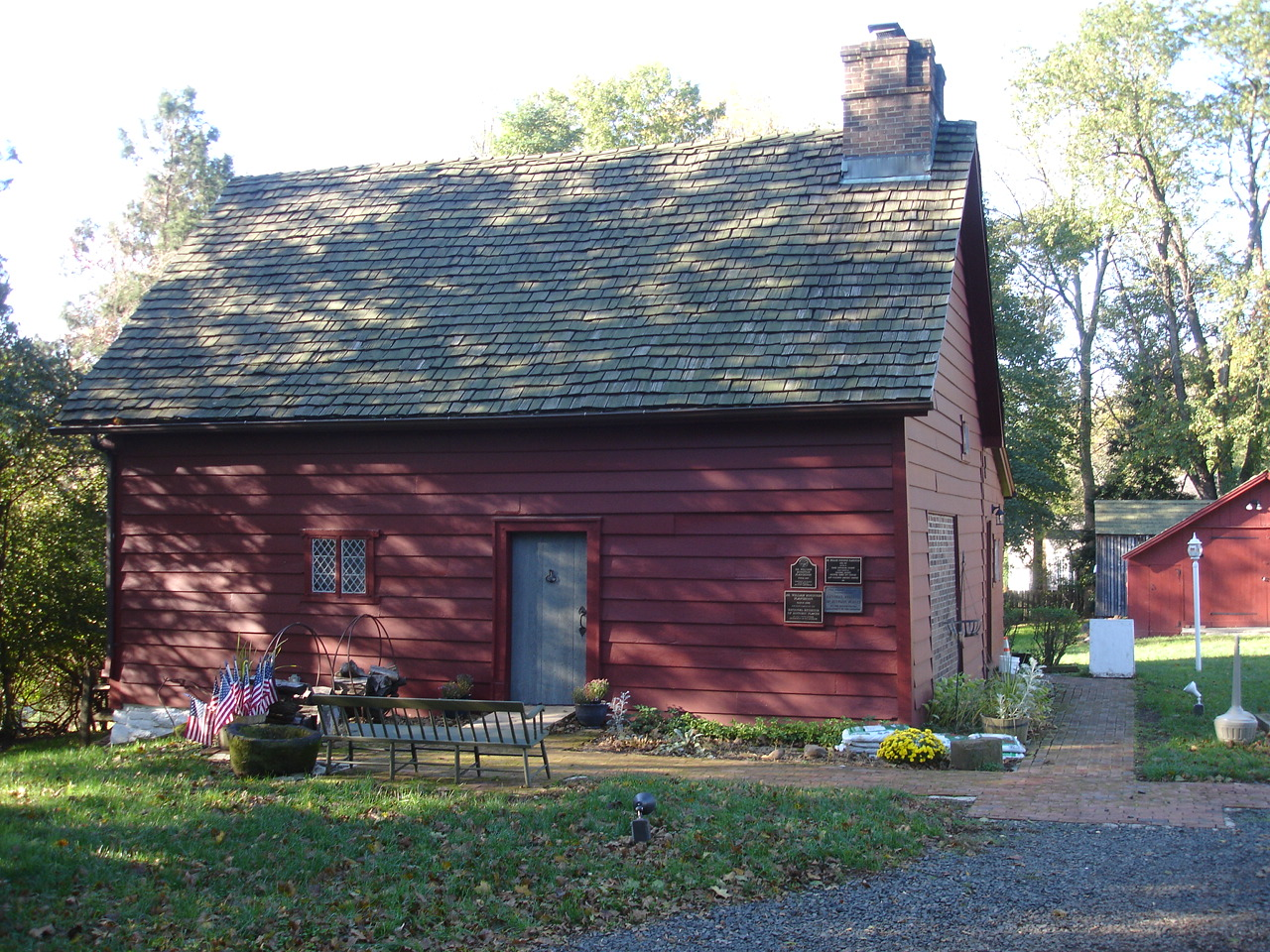
Robinson Plantation House

The territory that would become Clark was originally a part of several early settlements. The Robinson Plantation House and The Squire Hartshorne House, buildings from the late 17th century, are remnants of the era. The Homestead Farm at Oak Ridge was the site of a skirmish preceding the Battle of Short Hills. In 1858, after the City of Rahway was incorporated, the area of present-day Clark was designated as the 5th Ward of Rahway. Clark was incorporated as a township by an act of the New Jersey Legislature on March 23, 1864, from portions of Rahway. The township was named for Abraham Clark, a signer of the Declaration of Independence. Portions of the township were taken to form Cranford (March 14, 1871) and Winfield Township (August 6, 1941).

New Jersey Monthly magazine ranked Clark as its 33rd best place to live in its 2008 rankings of the "Best Places To Live" in New Jersey. In 2013, New Jersey Monthly magazine ranked Clark 174th in its rankings of "Best Places To Live" in New Jersey.

In July 2020, the Union County Prosecutor's Office opened an investigation into the Clark township police department and put the police chief and a captain on administrative leave after allegations of misconduct.

In March 2022, NJ Advance Media, a local newspaper, revealed a recording of Mayor Sal Bonaccorso using racial slurs when talking to members of the police department, despite him having previously denied doing so, and also saying women police officers were "disasters". The newspaper also reported that in January 2020, Clark Township had paid Clark police lieutenant Antonio Manata $400,000 to not reveal racist and sexist comments made by the Mayor and Chief of Police and to turn over the tapes he had recorded. On April 5, Bonaccorso admitted to using "hurtful and insensitive language" and apologized. The New Jersey Office of Public Integrity and Accountability subsequently took control of the Union County investigation.

== Geography ==
According to the United States Census Bureau, the township had a total area of 4.45 square miles (11.53 km^{2}), including 4.27 square miles (11.07 km^{2}) of land and 0.18 square miles (0.47 km^{2}) of water (4.04%).

Unincorporated communities, localities and place names located partially or completely within the township include Ashbrook, Florence Mills, Lenox, Madison Hill and Picton.

The Rahway River Parkway along the Rahway River runs through the township. The Robinson's Branch Reservoir, also known as the Clark Reservoir, is the largest body of water in Union County and bisects the township diagonally.

The township borders Scotch Plains and Westfield to the west, Cranford and Winfield Township to the north, Linden and Rahway to the east, and Edison and Woodbridge Township in Middlesex County to the south.

An abandoned rail spur, the Bloodgood Branch of the Lehigh Valley Railroad, runs through Clark.

== Demographics ==
Historical population
Census	Pop.	Note	%±
1870	331		—
1880	353		6.6%
1890	367		4.0%
1900	374		1.9%
1910	469		25.4%
1920	794		69.3%
1930	1,474		85.6%
1940	2,083		41.3%
1950	4,352		108.9%
1960	12,195		180.2%
1970	18,829		54.4%
1980	16,699		−11.3%
1990	14,629		−12.4%
2000	14,597		−0.2%
2010	14,756		1.1%
2020	15,544		5.3%
2023 (est.)	15,431		−0.7%
Population sources: 1870–1920 1870; 1880–1890 1890–1910 1910–1930; 1940–2000 2000; 2010 2020

=== 2020 census ===
Clark township, Union County, New Jersey – Racial and ethnic composition Note: the US Census treats Hispanic/Latino as an ethnic category. This table excludes Latinos from the racial categories and assigns them to a separate category. Hispanics/Latinos may be of any race.
Race / Ethnicity (NH = Non-Hispanic)	Pop 2000	Pop 2010	Pop 2020	% 2000	% 2010	% 2020
White alone (NH)	13,534	12,874	12,346	92.72%	87.25%	79.43%
Black or African American alone (NH)	35	116	231	0.24%	0.79%	1.49%
Native American or Alaska Native alone (NH)	1	7	4	0.01%	0.05%	0.03%
Asian alone (NH)	402	527	644	2.75%	3.57%	4.14%
Native Hawaiian or Pacific Islander alone (NH)	0	4	3	0.00%	0.03%	0.02%
Other race alone (NH)	16	27	46	0.11%	0.18%	0.30%
Mixed race or Multiracial (NH)	74	94	325	0.51%	0.64%	2.09%
Hispanic or Latino (any race)	535	1,107	1,945	3.67%	7.50%	12.51%
Total	14,597	14,756	15,544	100.00%	100.00%	100.00%

=== 2010 census ===
The 2010 United States census counted 14,756 people, 5,562 households, and 4,038 families in the township. The population density was 3,430.5 per square mile (1,324.5/km^{2}). There were 5,751 housing units at an average density of 1,337.0 per square mile (516.2/km^{2}). The racial makeup was 93.29% (13,766) White, 0.84% (124) Black or African American, 0.10% (15) Native American, 3.71% (547) Asian, 0.03% (5) Pacific Islander, 1.15% (169) from other races, and 0.88% (130) from two or more races. Hispanic or Latino of any race were 7.50% (1,107) of the population.

Of the 5,562 households, 30.2% had children under the age of 18; 60.4% were married couples living together; 9.0% had a female householder with no husband present and 27.4% were non-families. Of all households, 24.0% were made up of individuals and 12.0% had someone living alone who was 65 years of age or older. The average household size was 2.63 and the average family size was 3.15.

21.2% of the population were under the age of 18, 7.1% from 18 to 24, 23.6% from 25 to 44, 29.6% from 45 to 64, and 18.5% who were 65 years of age or older. The median age was 43.8 years. For every 100 females, the population had 92.6 males. For every 100 females ages 18 and older there were 88.8 males.

The Census Bureau's 2006–2010 American Community Survey showed that (in 2010 inflation-adjusted dollars) median household income was $80,959 (with a margin of error of +/− $7,674) and the median family income was $99,839 (+/− $7,789). Males had a median income of $65,399 (+/− $3,444) versus $49,649 (+/− $3,780) for females. The per capita income for the township was $37,288 (+/− $2,811). About 2.3% of families and 3.3% of the population were below the poverty line, including 3.3% of those under age 18 and 6.4% of those age 65 or over.

According to the 2009–2013 American Community Survey, the largest ancestry groups were:

- 26.9% Italian
- 19.8% Irish
- 13.1% Polish
- 11.9% German
- 8.5% American
- 6.2% Portuguese
- 3.4% Russian
- 2.9% English
- 2.2% Slovak
- 2.1% Spanish
- 1.9% Puerto Rican
- 1.4% Lithuanian
- 1.4% Ukrainian
- 1.3% Chinese
- 1.3% Cuban
- 1.2% Greek
- 1.0% Hungarian
- 1.0% Colombian
- 1.0% Arab

=== 2000 census ===
As of the 2000 United States census there were 14,597 people, 5,637 households, and 4,126 families residing in the township. The population density was 3,359.6 inhabitants per square mile (1,297.1/km^{2}). There were 5,709 housing units at an average density of 1,314.0 per square mile (507.3/km^{2}). The racial makeup of the township was 95.61% White, 0.30% African American, 0.01% Native American, 2.75% Asian, 0.63% from other races, and 0.69% from two or more races. Also Hispanic or Latino of any race were 3.67% of the population.

There were 5,637 households, out of which 28.1% had children under the age of 18 living with them, 61.4% were married couples living together, 9.0% had a female householder with no husband present, and 26.8% were non-families. 24.1% of all households were made up of individuals, and 12.9% had someone living alone who was 65 years of age or older. The average household size was 2.56 and the average family size was 3.07.

In the township the population was spread out, with 20.8% under the age of 18, 5.4% from 18 to 24, 27.6% from 25 to 44, 24.5% from 45 to 64, and 21.7% who were 65 years of age or older. The median age was 43 years. For every 100 females, there were 90.5 males. For every 100 females age 18 and over, there were 86.4 males.

The median income for a household in the township was $65,019, and the median income for a family was $77,291. Males had a median income of $54,543 versus $36,361 for females. The per capita income for the township was $29,883. About 1.0% of families and 1.7% of the population were below the poverty line, including 2.0% of those under age 18 and 2.7% of those age 65 or over.

== Government ==
=== Local government ===
Clark Township is governed within the Faulkner Act, formally known as the Optional Municipal Charter Law, under the Mayor-Council system of municipal government, which is governed by a "strong mayor". The township is one of 71 municipalities (of the 564) statewide that use this form of government.The Clark Township Committee is comprised of seven members, who are all chosen on a partisan basis in even-numbered years as part of the November general election. Three members are elected at-large from the township as a whole and four are elected from wards. The three council-at-large seats and mayor come up to vote together, and then the four ward seats are up for vote two years later.

As of 2026, the Mayor of Clark is Republican Angel Albanese, who was elected to serve the term of office ending December 31, 2028, that had been held by Sal Bonaccorso until he was forced to resign from office. Members of the Township Council are Council President Bill Smith (at-large; R, 2028), Council Vice President Frank G. Mazzarella (First Ward; R, 2026), Jessica Hoff (at-large; R, 2028; elected to serve an unexpired term), Steven M. Hund (Third Ward; R, 2026), Jimmy Minniti (at-large; R, 2028), Patrick O'Connor (Second Ward; R, 2026), and Brian P. Toal (Fourth Ward; R, 2026).

In January 2025, Mayor Sal Bonaccorso, who had just been re-elected for his seventh term, pleaded guilty to charges of criminal misconduct and was required to step down from office; Council President Angel Albanese was chosen to serve on an interim basis until November 2025, when she was elected to fill the balance of the term of office and Jessica Hoff was chosen to fill the vacant at-large seat that had been held by Albanese.

=== Federal, state and county representation ===
Clark is located in New Jersey's 7th Congressional District, and is part of New Jersey's 22nd state legislative district.

For the 119th United States Congress, New Jersey's 7th congressional district is represented by Thomas Kean Jr. (R, Westfield). New Jersey is represented in the United States Senate by Democrats Cory Booker (Newark, term ends 2027) and Andy Kim (Moorestown, term ends 2031).

For the 2026–2027 session, the 22nd legislative district of the New Jersey Legislature is represented in the State Senate by Nicholas Scutari (D, Linden) and in the General Assembly by Linda S. Carter (D, Plainfield) and James J. Kennedy (D, Rahway).

Union County is governed by a Board of County Commissioners, whose nine members are elected at-large to three-year terms of office on a staggered basis with three seats coming up for election each year, with an appointed County Manager overseeing the day-to-day operations of the county. At an annual reorganization meeting held in the beginning of January, the board selects a Chair and Vice Chair from among its members. As of 2026, Union County's County Commissioners are:

Vice Chair Rebecca Williams (D, Plainfield, 2028), Chairman Joesph Bodek (D, Linden, 2026), James E. Baker Jr. (D, Rahway, 2027), Michele Delisfort (D, Union Township, 2026), Lourdes M. Leon (D, Elizabeth, 2026), Alexander Mirabella (D, Fanwood, 2027) Kimberly Palmieri-Mouded (D, Westfield, 2027). Stanley J. Neron (D, Elizabeth, 2028), Joseph Signorello III (D, Roselle Park, 2028)

Constitutional officers elected on a countywide basis are: Clerk Vacant - Incumbent Clerk Joanne Rajoppi (D, Union Township) died on July 16, 2026. Her death triggered a special election for a full five-year term to be held concurrently with the November 2026 general election. Deputy Clerk Clara Fernández assumes the powers of the office until the vacancy is filled. Sheriff Peter Corvelli (D, Kenilworth, 2026) and Surrogate Christopher E. Hudak (D, Clark, 2027).

=== Politics ===
As of March 27, 2024, there were a total of 11,952 registered voters in Clark Township, of which 3,240 were registered as Democrats, 3,956 were registered as Republicans and 4,650 (49.4% vs. 42.9%) were registered as Unaffiliated. There were 106 voters registered as Libertarians or Greens. Among the township's 2010 Census population, 69.1% (vs. 53.3% in Union County) were registered to vote, including 87.6% of those ages 18 and over (vs. 70.6% countywide).

United States presidential election results for Clark
Year	Republican		Democratic		Third party(ies)	
Year	No.	%	No.	%	No.	%
2024	6,109	63.39%	3,372	34.99%	156	1.62%
2020	5,872	60.76%	3,659	37.86%	133	1.38%
2016	5,182	61.69%	2,967	35.32%	251	2.99%
2012	4,538	59.12%	3,041	39.62%	97	1.26%
2008	5,093	61.99%	3,038	36.98%	85	1.03%
2004	4,819	59.23%	3,237	39.79%	80	0.98%

In the 2012 presidential election, Republican Mitt Romney received 4,538 votes (58.6% vs. 32.3% countywide), ahead of Democrat Barack Obama with 3,041 votes (39.3% vs. 66.0%) and other candidates with 97 votes (1.3% vs. 0.8%), among the 7,741 ballots cast by the township's 10,614 registered voters, for a turnout of 72.9% (vs. 68.8% in Union County). In the 2008 presidential election, Republican John McCain received 5,093 votes (61.5% vs. 35.2% countywide), ahead of Democrat Barack Obama with 3,038 votes (36.7% vs. 63.1%) and other candidates with 85 votes (1.0% vs. 0.9%), among the 8,276 ballots cast by the township's 10,550 registered voters, for a turnout of 78.4% (vs. 74.7% in Union County). In the 2004 presidential election, Republican George W. Bush received 4,819 votes (58.7% vs. 40.3% countywide), ahead of Democrat John Kerry with 3,237 votes (39.4% vs. 58.3%) and other candidates with 80 votes (1.0% vs. 0.7%), among the 8,209 ballots cast by the township's 10,493 registered voters, for a turnout of 78.2% (vs. 72.3% in the whole county).

Gubernatorial election results for Clark
Year	Republican		Democratic		Third party(ies)	
Year	No.	%	No.	%	No.	%
2025	4,552	60.52%	2,930	38.95%	40	0.53%
2021	4,133	67.36%	1,972	32.14%	31	0.51%
2017	2,688	59.22%	1,734	38.20%	117	2.58%
2013	3,016	67.35%	1,402	31.31%	60	1.34%
2009	3,575	65.24%	1,500	27.37%	405	7.39%
2005	2,882	56.36%	2,047	40.03%	185	3.62%

In the 2017 gubernatorial election, Republican Kim Guadagno received 2,688 votes (59.2% vs. 32.6% countywide), ahead of Democrat Phil Murphy with 1,734 votes (38.2% vs. 65.2%), and other candidates with 117 votes (2.6% vs. 2.1%), among the 4,607 ballots cast by the township's 11,373 registered voters, for a turnout of 40.5%. In the 2013 gubernatorial election, Republican Chris Christie received 67.4% of the vote (3,016 cast), ahead of Democrat Barbara Buono with 31.3% (1,402 votes), and other candidates with 1.3% (60 votes), among the 4,549 ballots cast by the township's 10,438 registered voters (71 ballots were spoiled), for a turnout of 43.6%. In the 2009 gubernatorial election, Republican Chris Christie received 3,375 votes (63.4% vs. 41.7% countywide), ahead of Democrat Jon Corzine with 1,500 votes (28.2% vs. 50.6%), Independent Chris Daggett with 365 votes (6.9% vs. 5.9%) and other candidates with 40 votes (0.8% vs. 0.8%), among the 5,327 ballots cast by the township's 10,302 registered voters, yielding a 51.7% turnout (vs. 46.5% in the county).

United States Senate election results for Clark1
Year	Republican		Democratic		Third party(ies)	
Year	No.	%	No.	%	No.	%
2024	5,656	62.08%	3,330	36.55%	125	1.37%
2018	3,773	62.79%	1,988	33.08%	248	4.13%
2012	3,991	57.06%	2,877	41.13%	127	1.82%
2006	2,928	59.00%	1,922	38.73%	113	2.28%

United States Senate election results for Clark2
Year	Republican		Democratic		Third party(ies)	
Year	No.	%	No.	%	No.	%
2020	5,661	60.24%	3,620	38.52%	117	1.24%
2014	2,427	60.01%	1,532	37.88%	85	2.10%
2013	1,857	67.92%	856	31.31%	21	0.77%
2008	6,012	51.07%	5,640	47.91%	119	1.01%

== Education ==
The Clark Public School District serves students in pre-kindergarten through twelfth grade. As of the 2019–20 school year, the district, comprised of five schools, had an enrollment of 2,299 students and 184.7 classroom teachers (on an FTE basis), for a student–teacher ratio of 12.4:1. Schools in the district (with 2019–20 enrollment data from the National Center for Education Statistics) are Clark Preschool with 20 students in Pre-K, Frank K. Hehnly Elementary School with 551 students in grades K–5, Valley Road Elementary School with 435 students in grades K–5, Carl H. Kumpf Middle School with 518 students in grades 6–8 and Arthur L. Johnson High School with 708 students in grades 9–12. Students from Garwood attend the district's high school as part of a sending/receiving relationship with the Garwood Public Schools.

Students who excel in middle school have the opportunity to attend the Union County Magnet High School and the other programs of the Union County Vocational Technical Schools, which accept students from across the county on the basis of admissions examinations and applications.

Mother Seton Regional High School is an all-girls, private, Roman Catholic high school, operated under the auspices of the Roman Catholic Archdiocese of Newark. St. John the Apostle School School is a co-ed K–12 school, also operated under the auspices of the same archdiocese. It was dedicated as a National Blue Ribbon school in 2011.

The Clark Scholarship Fund is a not-for-profit organization that has provided need-based scholarships to college-bound Clark residents since 1955, funded entirely by contributions from individuals and businesses.

== Transportation ==
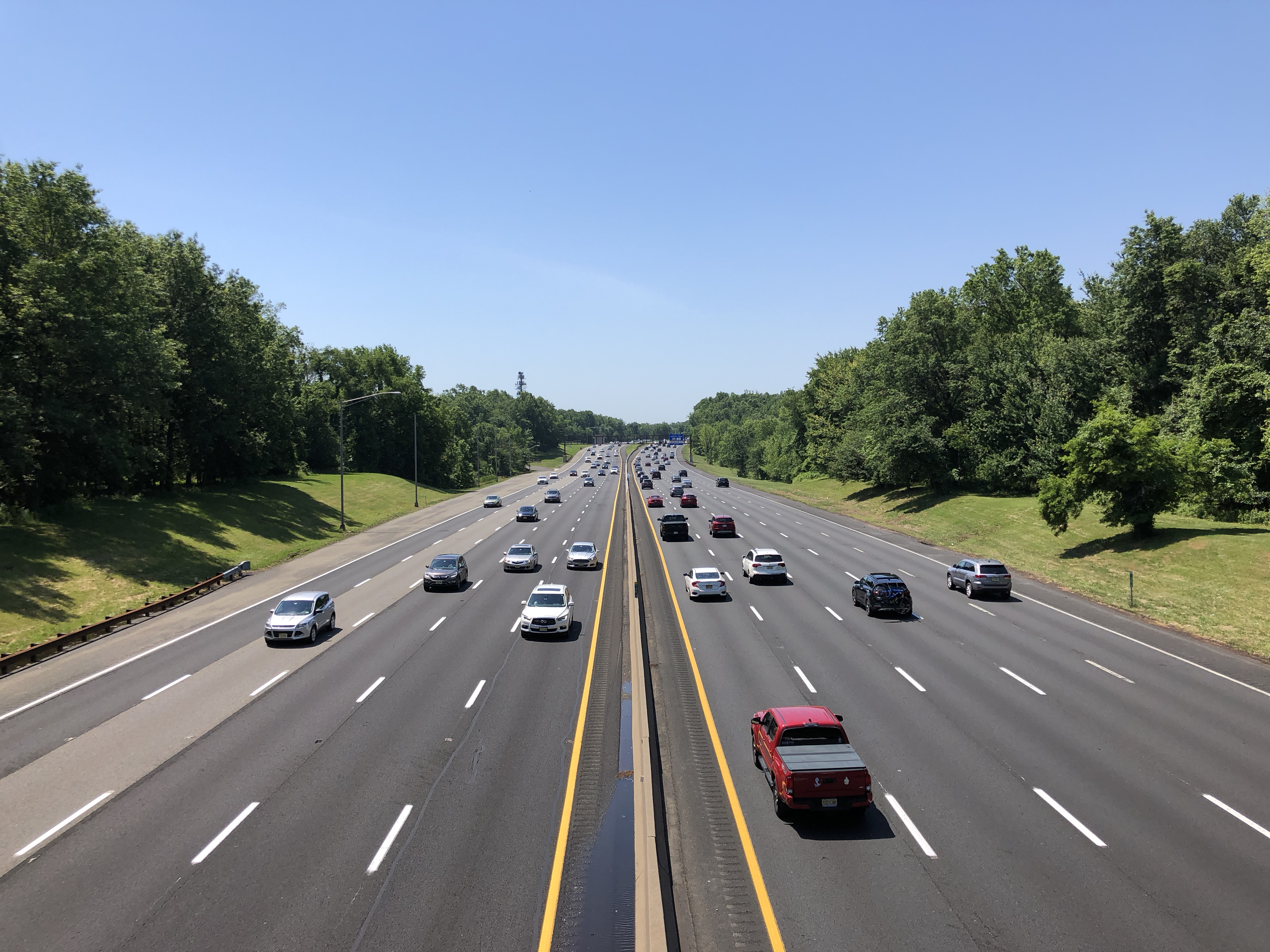
The Garden State Parkway southbound in Clark

=== Roads and highways ===
As of May 2010, the township had a total of 58.95 miles (94.87 km) of roadways, of which 48.34 miles (77.80 km) were maintained by the municipality, 8.03 miles (12.92 km) by Union County, and 2.58 miles (4.15 km) by the New Jersey Turnpike Authority.

The Clark Circle connects Central Avenue, Brant Avenue, Valley Road, and at Exit 135 of the Garden State Parkway, which passes through the township. The New Jersey Turnpike Authority redesigned the circle as part of a project that ran from 2007 to 2009 under which the movements at the circle are now controlled by traffic lights. Interchange 135 on the Parkway is signed for Clark / Westfield.

=== Public transportation ===
The Lehigh Valley Railroad served Clark with a passenger station in the Picton section. The rail line remains active under Conrail's auspices, excluding the Bloodgood Branch spur which is now out of service. The closest NJ Transit rail station is in Rahway, located approximately 2 miles (3.2 km) from the center of Clark.

NJ Transit also provides bus service to New York City and points in-between. The 112 route provides service to the Port Authority Bus Terminal in New York City, as well as stops throughout downtown Elizabeth.

Newark Liberty International Airport is approximately 11 miles (18 km) from Clark.

== Arts and culture ==
- The Union County Celtic Festival is held annually in May.
- The Deutscher Club of Clark was founded in 1935 and is one of the largest German clubs in the US. It offers German food, beer, music and entertainment events to the public.
- The Clark chapter of Unico National, known as Clark Unico, is an Italian American service organization and social club.
- The Polish Cultural Foundation is a nonprofit organization that hosts the Skulski Art Gallery and Polish cultural classes.
- The Clark Recreation Department hosts a summer concert series.

== Parks and recreation ==
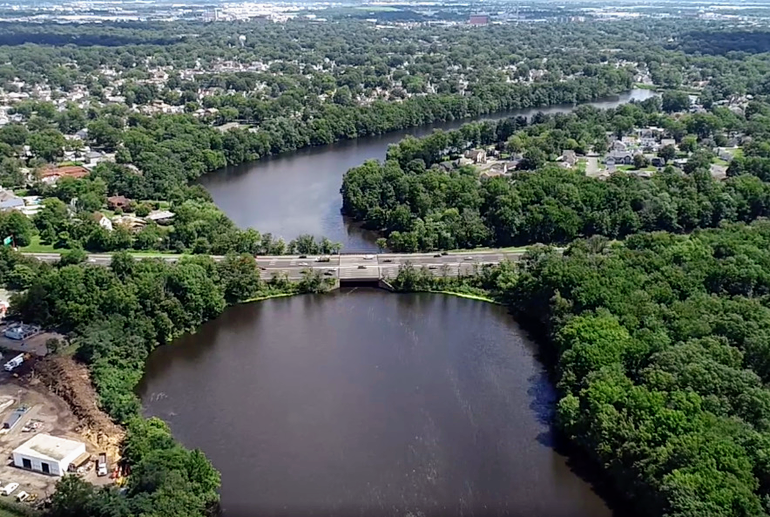
The Clark Reservoir

- Oak Ridge Park is a county-operated former golf course turned recreational park in Clark.
- The Clark Recreation Department offers a variety of recreational opportunities in town, including the Clark Community Pool.
- The Rahway River Parkway, a greenway of parkland around the Rahway River, snakes through the east side of Clark and includes Bloodgoods Pond, Jackson Pond, and the northernmost portion of Rahway River Park.
- Esposito Park, named a destination park worth traveling for by New Jersey Family magazine, is located near St. Mary's Cemetery.
- Hyatt Hills Golf Complex is a 9-hole golf course in Clark.
- The proposed Clark Reservoir Recreation Area is an area of natural land surrounding the decommissioned Robinson's Branch Reservoir (also known as the Clark Reservoir), which is currently being rehabilitated for recreation.

== Notable people ==
People who were born in, residents of, or otherwise closely associated with Clark include:

- Todd Burger (born 1970), former offensive guard who played for the New York Jets
- Halsey (born 1994), singer
- Kenneth Ham (born 1964), NASA astronaut
- Jeffrey Lichtman (born 1965), defense attorney who represented Joaquin "El Chapo" Guzman and John Gotti Jr.
- William J. Maguire (1916–1997), politician who served as mayor of Clark and in the New Jersey General Assembly from 1976 to 1982
- Ed Pinkham (born 1953), former college football coach
- Matt Poskay (born 1984), professional lacrosse player for the Boston Cannons
- Jane Remover (born 2003), musician
- Erik Rosenmeier (born 1965), former NFL center who played for the Buffalo Bills in 1987
- George M. Scott (1922–2006), associate justice of the Minnesota Supreme Court
- Robert Sparks (born 1947), former handball player who competed in the 1972 Summer Olympics and in the 1976 Summer Olympics
- Frank Spaziani (born 1947), former head football coach for Boston College Eagles football
- Kurt Sutter (born 1964), creator of the television show Sons of Anarchy who plays the character Otto Delaney in the show
- Dave Toma (born 1933), whose life in law enforcement was the basis of the television shows Toma and Baretta
