= Vagelos =

Vagelos may refer to:

- P. Roy Vagelos of Merck
- Vagelos Scholars Program In Molecular Life Sciences
