= Andre Neblett =

American football player (born 1988)

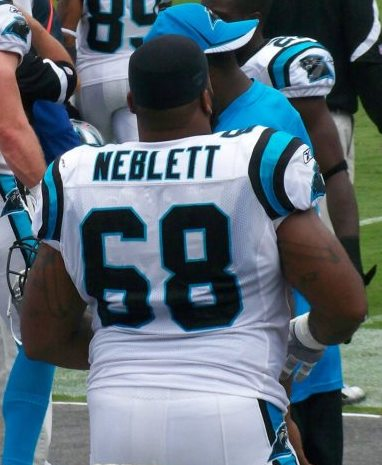
- Neblett in 2011

No. 68, 71
- Position: Defensive tackle

Personal information
- Born: June 7, 1988 (age 38); Rahway, New Jersey, U.S.
- Listed height: 6 ft 0 in (1.83 m)
- Listed weight: 310 lb (141 kg)

Career information
- High school: Rahway
- College: Temple
- NFL draft: 2010: undrafted

Career history
- Carolina Panthers (2010−2012); Tampa Bay Buccaneers (2013)*; New England Patriots (2013)
- * Offseason or practice squad member only

Awards and highlights
- First-team All-MAC (2009)

Career NFL statistics
- Total tackles: 40
- Sacks: 3
- Fumble recoveries: 2
- Stats at Pro Football Reference

Andre Neblett (born June 7, 1988) is an American former professional football player who was a defensive tackle for four seasons in the National Football League (NFL). He played college football for the Temple Owls and was signed by the Carolina Panthers as an undrafted free agent in 2010. He was also a member of the Tampa Bay Buccaneers and New England Patriots.

In 2016, Neblett became involved with NASCAR, after he was selected as part of a national combine for the Drive for Diversity crew development program.

== Early life ==
Raised in Rahway, New Jersey, Neblett played prep football as a fullback and linebacker at Rahway High School.

== College career ==
Neblett played college football at Temple, where he started in 45 games for the Owls. He earned All-Mid-American Conference honors during his career.

== Professional career ==
=== Carolina Panthers ===
On April 30, 2010, Neblett was signed by the Carolina Panthers as an undrafted free agent following the 2010 NFL draft. On July 18, 2012, Neblett was informed by the NFL that he would be suspended for the first four games of the season for testing positive for performance-enhancing drugs.

=== Tampa Bay Buccaneers ===
Neblett signed with the Tampa Bay Buccaneers on May 6, 2013. On August 31, 2013, Neblett was released during the final roster cuts of the preseason.

=== New England Patriots ===
Neblett signed with the New England Patriots on October 9, 2013, but was released later that week on October 12. He was re-signed when the Patriots put linebacker Jerod Mayo on injured reserve on October 16. Neblett was released again on October 21.
