= Rahway Public Schools =

School district in Union County, New Jersey, US

Address
- 1157 Kline Place Rahway, Union County, New Jersey, 07065; United States
- Coordinates: 40.60792°N 74.282049°W

District information
- Grades: PreK to 12
- Superintendent: Aleya Shoieb
- Business administrator: Eric Burnside
- Schools: 6

Students and staff
- Enrollment: 4,311 (as of 2024–25)
- Faculty: 327.1 FTEs
- Student–teacher ratio: 13.2:1

Other information
- District Factor Group: CD
- Website: www.rahway.net
Ind.	Per pupil	District spending	Rank (*)	K-12 average	%± vs. average
1A	Total Spending	$18,744	59	$18,891	−0.8%
1	Budgetary Cost	14,591	54	14,783	−1.3%
2	Classroom Instruction	8,954	63	8,763	2.2%
6	Support Services	2,373	57	2,392	−0.8%
8	Administrative Cost	1,391	42	1,485	−6.3%
10	Operations & Maintenance	1,524	41	1,783	−14.5%
13	Extracurricular Activities	323	81	268	20.5%
16	Median Teacher Salary	65,257	54	64,043
Data from NJDoE 2014 Taxpayers' Guide to Education Spending. *Of K-12 districts with more than 3,500 students. Lowest spending=1; Highest=103

The Rahway Public Schools are a comprehensive community public school district that serves students in pre-kindergarten through twelfth grade from Rahway, in Union County, in the U.S. state of New Jersey.

As of the 2024–25 school year, the district, comprised of six schools, had an enrollment of 4,311 students and 327.1 classroom teachers (on an FTE basis), for a student–teacher ratio of 13.2:1.

The district had been classified by the New Jersey Department of Education as being in District Factor Group "CD", the sixth-highest of eight groupings. District Factor Groups organize districts statewide to allow comparison by common socioeconomic characteristics of the local districts. From lowest socioeconomic status to highest, the categories are A, B, CD, DE, FG, GH, I and J.

== Schools ==
Schools in the district (with 2024–25 enrollment data from the National Center for Education Statistics) are:

Elementary schools

- Grover Cleveland Elementary School with 453 students in grades PreK–6
  - Lee Andrea Garvin, principal
- Franklin Elementary School with 658 students in grades PreK–6
  - Patrick Holness, principal
- Madison Elementary School with 384 students in grades PreK–6
  - Doris "Dee" Jones, principal
- Roosevelt Elementary School with 608 students in grades PreK–6
  - Leslie Septor, principal

Middle school

- Rahway 7th & 8th Grade Academy with 701 students in grades 7–8
  - Isabel Colon, principal

High school

- Rahway High School with 1,286 students in grades 9–12
  - Michelle Panichi, principal

== Administration ==
Core members of the district's administration are:

- Aleya Shoieb, superintendent
- Eric Burnside, business administrator and board secretary

== Board of education ==
The district's board of education is comprised of nine members who set policy and oversee the fiscal and educational operation of the district through its administration. As a Type II school district, the board's trustees are elected directly by voters to serve three-year terms of office on a staggered basis, with three seats up for election each year held (since 2012) as part of the November general election. The board appoints a superintendent to oversee the district's day-to-day operations and a business administrator to supervise the business functions of the district.
