= Mark Slonaker =

American college basketball coach (born 1957)

Biographical details
- Born: February 14, 1957 (age 69); Rahway, New Jersey, U.S.

Playing career
- 1975–1979: Georgia

Coaching career (HC unless noted)
- 1980–1983: The Lovett School
- 1983–1984: Georgia State (assistant)
- 1984–1985: Georgia State
- 1985–1989: Georgia State (assistant)
- 1989–1995: Georgia (assistant)
- 1995–1997: Pensacola JC
- 1997–2008: Mercer

Head coaching record
- Overall: 129–213

Accomplishments and honors

Championships
- Atlantic Sun regular season (2003)

Awards
- Jim Phelan Award (2003); Atlantic Sun Coach of the Year (2003)

Mark Slonaker (born February 14, 1957) was an American college basketball coach. He is the former head coach of the Mercer Bears men's basketball team. He was the 2002–03 Jim Phelan National Coach of the Year after leading Mercer to the best one season turnaround in NCAA history, improving from 6–23 to 23–6. The team won the Atlantic Sun regular season championship with a 14–2 conference record and made school history for number of wins (23); Mercer won 22 games in 1923–24 and 1984–85. The season ended with a loss in the Atlantic Sun tournament. Slonaker was the first National Coach of the Year to receive the award after it was named in honor of Jim Phelan. Slonaker's contract was not renewed after the 2007–08 season.

Slonaker grew up in Rahway, New Jersey, where he played prep basketball at Rahway High School. He was a four-year Letterman at the University of Georgia under Hugh Durham from 1975 to 1979. He was named co-captain during his senior year. He graduated with a B.A. in Education before attending Georgia State University where he earned a Masters in Sports Administration. From 2009 to 2015, Slonaker served as the radio color commentator for the Georgia Bulldogs Men's Basketball team. From 2011 to 2015, Slonaker was the executive director of the Georgia Bulldog Club. Slonaker has served in his current role, executive director of athletics alumni relations, since 2015 for University of Georgia Athletics.

== Head coaching record ==
Record table
Season	Coach	Overall	Conference	Standing	Postseason
Georgia State (Trans American Athletic Conference) (1984–1985)
1984–85	Georgia State	1–24*	0–14*	8th	
Georgia State:		1–24 (.040)	0–14 (.000)		
Mercer (Trans American Athletic Conference/Atlantic Sun Conference) (1997–2008)
1997–98	Mercer	5–21	2–14	6th (West)	
1998–99	Mercer	8–18	5–11	9th	
1999–2000	Mercer	12–21	7–11	8th	
2000–01	Mercer	13–15	10–8	6th	
2001–02	Mercer	6–23	4–16	11th	
2002–03	Mercer	23–6	14–2	T–1st (West)	
2003–04	Mercer	12–18	9–11	6th	
2004–05	Mercer	16–12	11–9	T–4th	
2005–06	Mercer	9–19	7–13	9th	
2006–07	Mercer	13–17	8–10	6th	
2007–08	Mercer	11–19	6–10	T–8th	
Mercer:		128–189 (.404)	83–115 (.419)		
Total:		129–213 (.377)			
National champion Postseason invitational champion Conference regular season champion Conference regular season and conference tournament champion Division regular season champion Division regular season and conference tournament champion Conference tournament champion

*Named interim coach for the final 25 games.
