= Richard Moran (author) =

Richard A. Moran
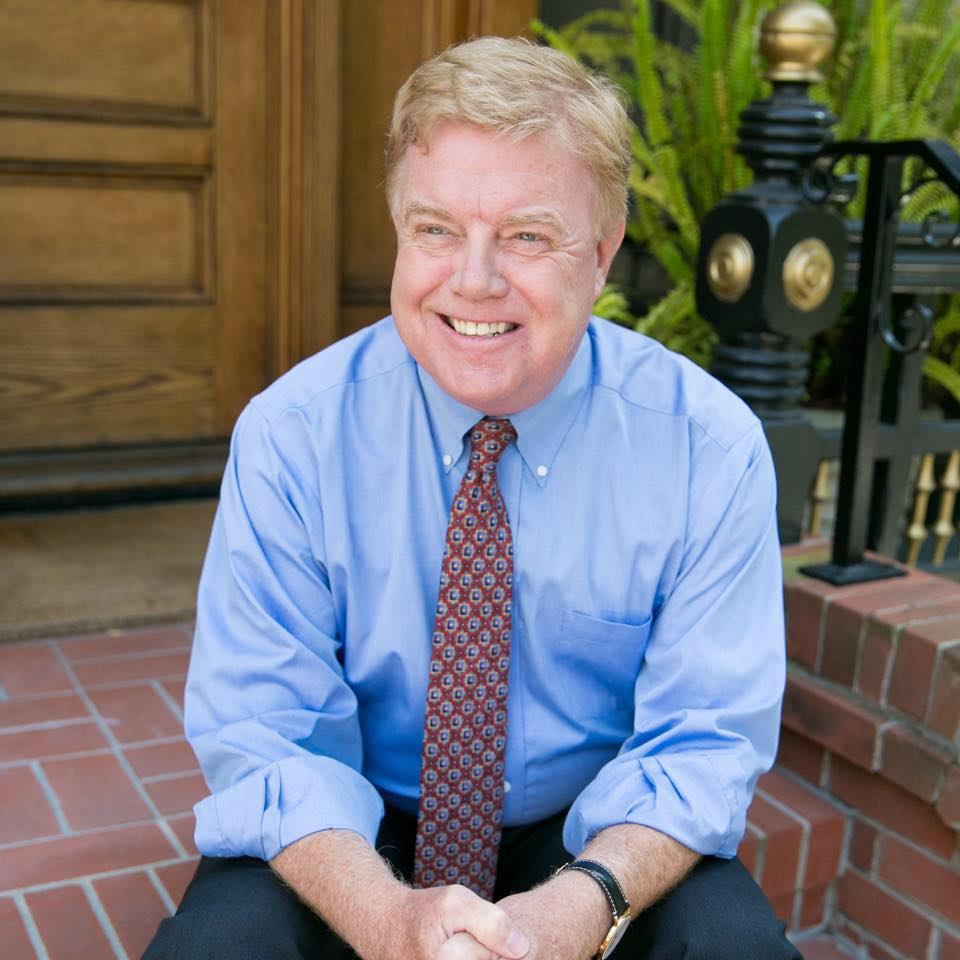
- Born: 1950 (age 75–76)
- Education: Rutgers College; Indiana University Bloomington; Miami University
- Occupations: Author, CEO, Venture Capitalist
- Notable work: Never Confuse a Memo with Reality, Sins and CEOs
- Website: http://richardmoran.com/

Richard A. Moran is a San Francisco based speaker, investor, venture capitalist, author and president emeritus of Menlo College. He is known for his series of business books beginning with, Never Confuse a Memo with Reality that established the genre of "Business Bullet Books."

== Biography ==
Raised in Rahway, New Jersey, Moran graduated in 1968 from Rahway High School.

Moran is General Partner at QNova Capital https://qnova.capital/ and founding partner of Blue Book Ventures. Investments include: RightRice, SiSaf, PopChips, Warehouse Exchange and AxoProtego, as well as a variety of start-ups in media and entertainment. He serves on the Board of Directors of Charli.ai https://charli.ai/ and as an advisor to Craft.co https://craft.co/, OROS https://www.orosapparel.com/pages/oros-technology and LBA Realty https://lbarealty.com/. He hosts the weekly show "In the Workplace" on KCBS Radio. https://www.audacy.com/kcbsradio

Moran was the tenth president of Menlo College, a private four year college located in Silicon Valley. He is the first former president there given the "Emeritus" status for his contributions. Moran previously served as CEO and vice chairman at Accretive Solutions, a national professional services firm with a focus on accounting, information technology and outsourcing. Accretive Solutions was sold in December 2017 to Resources Global Professionals.

Prior to Accretive Solutions, Moran was a partner at Venrock, chairman of the board at Portal Software which was sold to Oracle for $220M.

The Moran Family owns and operates a vineyard and winery in Knights Valley in Sonoma County. Moran chronicles the development of the vineyard and restoring an old house in his column "In the Country" which has been running in wine country newspapers since 1997. The column received third place in journalism at the 2018 California Journalism Awards.

== Writing ==
Moran has written ten business books. His work has been translated into eight languages.

- The Accidental Vineyard, An Old House, New Vines and a Changed Life in Wine Country,2025, BenBella Books, ISBN 978-7747414 released in October 2025. The audible version of the book is narrated by George Newbern George Newbern The National Trust for Historic Preservation cited the book as a key read to beat winter. https://savingplaces.org/stories/comfort-curiosity-and-connection-winter-book-lis

Works related to business and the workplace include:

- Never Say Whatever, How Small Decisions Make A Big Difference, 2023, McGraw Hill, ISBN 978-126476-9643.
- Trump@Work, 2020, ISBN 978-0-367-27354-5
- The Thing About Work: Showing Up and Other Important Matters: A Worker's Manual was released in October 2016.
- Navigating Tweets, Feats, and Deletes: Lessons for the New Workplace (2014)(ISBN 978-0-9904012-1-6)
- Sins and CEOs: Lessons from Leaders and Losers That Will Change Your Career (2011)
- Nuts Bolts & Jolts: Fundamental Business and Life Lessons You Must Know (2006) (ISBN 978-1600080159)
- Fear No Yellow Stickies: More Business Wisdom Too Simple Not to Know (1998) (ISBN 978-0684852195)
- Cancel the Meeting, Keep the Doughnuts: And Other New Morsels of Business Wisdom (1995) (ISBN 978-0887307300)
- Beware Those Who Ask For Feedback: And Other Organizational Constants (1994) (ISBN 978-0887307102)
- Never Confuse A Memo with Reality: And Other Business Lessons Too Simple Not to Know (1993) (ISBN 978-0887306693)
