= Rahway High School =

High school in Union County, New Jersey, United States

Location
- 1012 Madison Avenue; Rahway, Union County, New Jersey 07065; United States; 40.610762°N 74.293119°W

Information
- Type: Public high school
- School district: Rahway Public Schools
- NCES School ID: 341353005634
- Principal: Dawe Peralta (acting)
- Faculty: 103.1 FTEs
- Grades: 9–12
- Enrollment: 1,270 (as of 2023–24)
- Student to teacher ratio: 12.3:1
- Colors: Red and Black
- Athletics conference: Union County Interscholastic Athletic Conference (general); Big Central Football Conference (football)
- Team name: Indians
- Accreditation: Middle States Association of Colleges and Schools
- Newspaper: Rho Eta Sigma
- Yearbook: Allegarooter
- Website: rhs.rahway.net

Rahway High School is a four-year public high school that serves students in ninth through twelfth grades from Rahway, in Union County, in the U.S. state of New Jersey, operating as the lone secondary school of the Rahway Public Schools. The high school's present location was built in 1941. The school has been accredited by the Middle States Association of Colleges and Schools Commission on Elementary and Secondary Schools since 1931; the school's current accreditation extends until July 2029.

As of the 2023–24 school year, the school had an enrollment of 1,270 students and 103.1 classroom teachers (on an FTE basis), for a student–teacher ratio of 12.3:1. There were 619 students (48.7% of enrollment) eligible for free lunch and 108 (8.5% of students) eligible for reduced-cost lunch.

== Awards, recognition and rankings ==
The school was the 215th-ranked public high school in New Jersey out of 339 schools statewide in New Jersey Monthly magazine's September 2014 cover story on the state's “Top Public High Schools,” using a new ranking methodology. The school had been ranked 191st in the state of 328 schools in 2012, after being ranked 261st in 2010 out of 322 schools listed. The magazine ranked the school 249th in 2008 out of 316 schools. Schooldigger.com ranked the school as 316th out of 376 public high schools statewide in its 2010 rankings (a decrease of 13 positions from the 2009 rank) which were based on the combined percentage of students classified as proficient or above proficient on the language arts literacy and mathematics components of the High School Proficiency Assessment (HSPA).

== Advanced Placement courses ==
Rahway High School offers Advanced Placement courses in AP English Language and Composition, AP English Literature and Composition, AP United States History, AP United States Government and Politics, AP Comparative Government & Politics, AP Calculus, AP Statistics, AP Chemistry, AP Biology, and AP Physics.

=== Advanced Placement Incentive Program (APIP) ===
Beginning in 2007 with support from Rahway alumnus and former Merck & Co. CEO P. Roy Vagelos, President of The Marianthi Foundation, the new Advanced Placement Incentive Program (APIP) was introduced. The APIP Program involves naming teachers as AP Teacher, Pre-AP Placement Teacher, Lead Teacher, and AP Advisor, providing financial incentives for students and teachers based upon AP enrollment and AP exam results.

=== Vagelos Scholars Program ===
Rahway High School seniors who are admitted to and attend a U.S. News & World Report ranked Top 25 National University or Liberal Arts College will receive a scholarship from the Marianthi Foundation. The Vagelos Scholarship, established in 2001, is funded by retired Merck and Co. CEO P. Roy Vagelos.

== Athletics ==
The Rahway High School Indians compete in the Union County Interscholastic Athletic Conference, which is comprised of public and private high schools in Union County and was established following a reorganization of sports leagues in Northern New Jersey by the New Jersey State Interscholastic Athletic Association (NJSIAA). Prior to the NJSIAA's 2009 realignment, the school had participated in the Mountain Valley Conference, which included public and private high schools in Essex, Somerset and Union counties. With 784 students in grades 10–12, the school was classified by the NJSIAA for the 2019–20 school year as Group III for most athletic competition purposes, which included schools with an enrollment of 761 to 1,058 students in that grade range. The football team competes in Division 3 of the Big Central Football Conference, which includes 60 public and private high schools in Hunterdon, Middlesex, Somerset, Union and Warren counties, which are broken down into 10 divisions by size and location. The school was classified by the NJSIAA as Group IV North for football for 2024–2026, which included schools with 893 to 1,315 students.

The boys' basketball team won the Class B (since reclassified as Group III) state championship in 1930, defeating Weehawken High School by a score of 24–16 in the tournament final played in front of a crowd of 5,000 at the 144th Regiment Armory in Elizabeth.

The boys cross country team won the Group III state championship in 1952.

The boys' track team won the indoor relay state championships in Group IV in 1970, and in Group III in 1972 and 1981, and in Group II in 2007, 2009 and 2018. The six state championships are the seventh-most of any public high school in the state.

The boys track team won the indoor track Group III state championship in 1971 and 1972. The girls team won the Group III title in 1983 (as co-champion) and 1984.

The boys track team won the spring / outdoor track title as Group III champion in 1971, 1972 and 1985.

The football team won the North II Group III state sectional championships in 1978, 1979 and 1984. In 1978, the team scored two touchdowns in the final five minutes of the North II Group III sectional championship game to defeat Phillipsburg High School by a score of 23–10 in front of a crowd of 4,500 to finish the season with a 9–2 record. The 1979 team finished the season with a 10–1 record after defeating Phillipsburg High School by a score of 14–6 in the North II Group III state sectional championship game played at Giants Stadium.

The girls track team won the spring track Group III state title in 1983.

The wrestling team won the North II Group II state sectional championship in 1989 and 1999, and won in North II Group III in 2001

The boys bowling team won the Group I state championship in 2015.

== Extracurricular activities ==
Allegarooter, the Rahway High School yearbook received statewide recognition for earning the 2007 and 2008 Garden State Scholastic Press Association Yearbook 1st Place Gold Award in Content and Design.

Rahway High School also has the Marine Corps JROTC Drill Team, the Devil Pups. This team competes in the National High School Drill Team Championships, held annually at Daytona Beach, Florida. In May 2008, the Devil Pups earned the title of Overall National Champions at NHSDTC. In addition to the overall title, the team also brought home several more first- and second-place trophies in each section at the event: Inspection, Regulation, Color Guard, and Exhibition. In the area of Armed Dual Exhibition, the team claimed both first and second place in that event, a feat never before seen at NHSDTC.

The Devil Pups were featured in the Disney Channel made-for cable movie Cadet Kelly (2002) after earning a National Runner-Up trophy in Platoon Exhibition the previous year.

Rahway High School has been involved in U.S. FIRST Robotics since 2003 and has won their first ever District event (in Mount Olive) during the 2014–2015 FRC season.

=== Fine and performing arts ===
The Musical Theater program has been largely recognized by the Paper Mill Playhouse Rising Star program as one of the finest in the state, with awards won in 2003 for "Outstanding Achievement in Choreography" for the production of Crazy for You. In 2004, the school lead in nominations with 14 and was honored for "Outstanding Achievement in Costume Design" for the production of 42nd Street.

The Paper Mill Playhouse nominated Rahway High School's Spring 2009 production of The Will Rogers Follies in 13 categories, and was awarded four Rising Star Awards for "Outstanding Costuming Achievement", "Outstanding Achievement by a Teacher or an Outside Director", "Outstanding Achievement by a Chorus", and "Outstanding Overall Production".

In 2011, Rahway High School was awarded the Educational Impact Award by the Paper Mill Playhouse for its production of West Side Story.

=== Marching Indians ===
In 2003 and 2005, the Rahway High School Marching Band took first place in the USSBA state championship.

== Administration ==
The school's acting principal is Dawe Peralta, whose core administration team includes two vice principals. Peralta was named as acting principal in August 2024, filling the place of Cary Fields who since April 2024 had been on a leave of absence.

== Notable alumni ==
Notable alumni of Rahway High School include:

- Antonio Alfano (born 2000), defensive tackle for the Edmonton Elks of the Canadian Football League
- Kimberly Brandão (born 1984), retired professional footballer who played as a centre back and was a captain of the Portugal women's national team
- Darrion Caldwell (born 1987), three-time state wrestling champion who is a mixed martial artist competing for Bellator MMA
- Louis Campbell (born 1979), professional basketball player, who played for Antibes Sharks of the LNB Pro A
- Earl Clark (born 1988, class of 2006), basketball player for the Los Angeles Lakers of the NBA
- Dion Dawkins (born 1994), offensive tackle for the Buffalo Bills of the NFL
- Milton Friedman (1912–2006), economist, 1976 Nobel Laureate recipient
- Antonio Garay (born 1979), defensive tackle for the San Diego Chargers
- Wayne Gilchrest (born 1946), U.S. Congressman who represented Maryland's 1st congressional district
- Alfred M. Gray Jr. (1928–2024), 29th Commandant of the Marine Corps, from July 1, 1987 to June 30, 1991
- Jerome Kagan (1929–2021, class of 1946), psychologist, Harvard University professor, pioneer in the field of developmental psychology
- Janis Karpinski (born 1953), retired career officer in the United States Army Reserve who commanded the forces that operated Abu Ghraib and other prisons in Iraq
- Kenneth R. Miller (born 1948), Professor of Biology at Brown University
- Jeffrey Moran (born 1946), Ocean County Surrogate and former member of the New Jersey General Assembly
- Richard Moran (born 1950), investor, venture capitalist, author and president emeritus of Menlo College
- Andre Neblett (born 1988), American football defensive tackle who played in the NFL for the Carolina Panthers and the New England Patriots
- Olsen Pierre (born 1991), American football defensive end who played in the NFL for the Arizona Cardinals
- Eric Roberson (born 1976), singer, songwriter and producer
- Carl Sagan (1934–1996), astronomer, astrochemist, author, and popularizer of astronomy, astrophysics and other natural sciences
- Bob Scarpitto (born 1939), former professional football player
- Mark Slonaker (born 1957), college basketball coach who was head coach of the Mercer Bears men's basketball team
- Allan Vaché (born 1953, class of 1971), jazz clarinetist
- Warren Vaché Jr. (born 1951), jazz trumpeter, cornetist, and flugelhornist
- P. Roy Vagelos (born 1929), retired Merck & Co. CEO
- Joe Williams (1941–2015), football player for the Winnipeg Blue Bombers, Ottawa Rough Riders and Toronto Argonauts in the Canadian Football League
- Shanice Williams (born 1996), performer who appeared in the lead role as Dorothy in NBC's 2015 presentation of The Wiz Live!
