= Antonio Alfano =

American football player (born 2000)

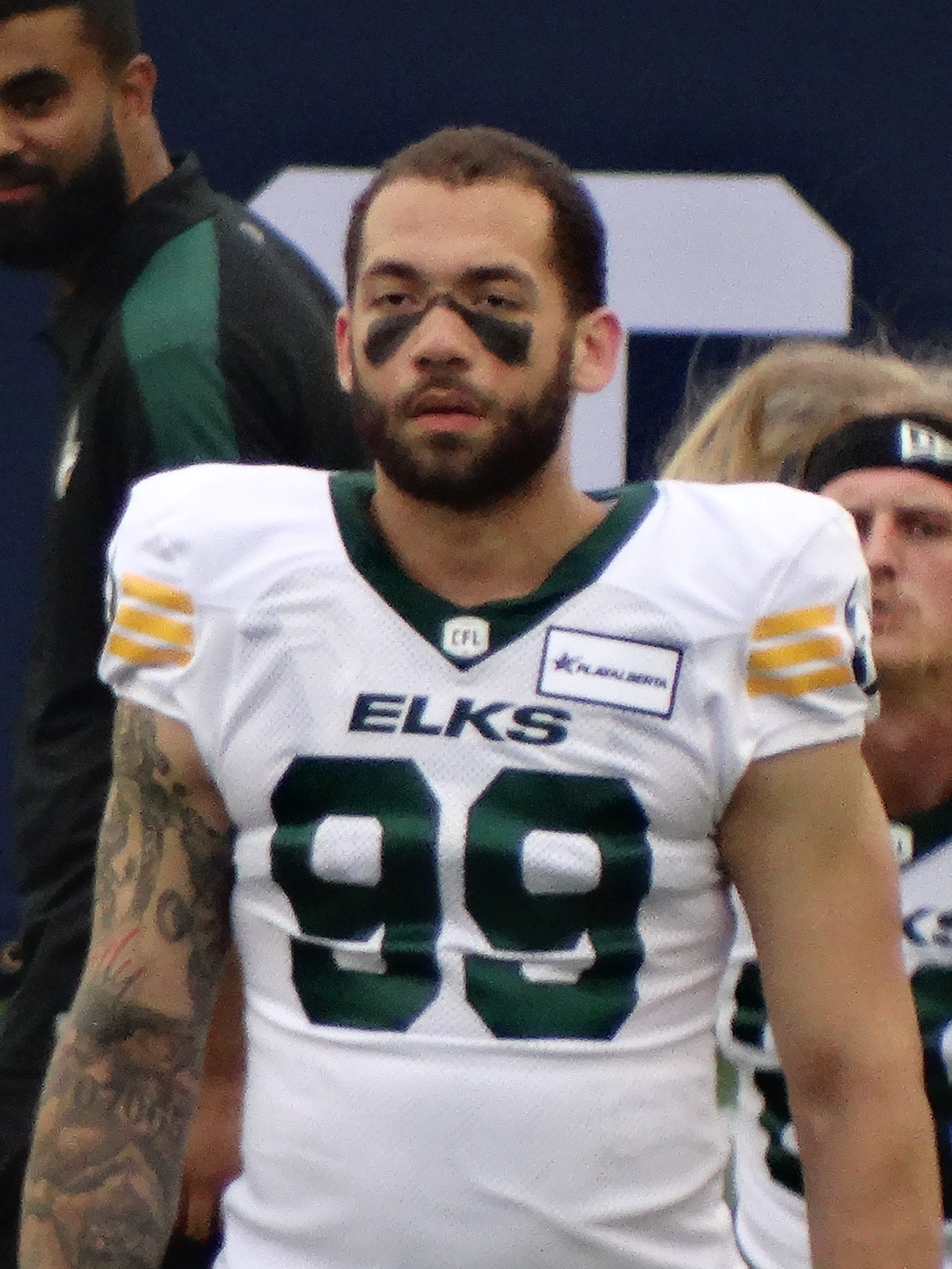
- Alfano with the Edmonton Elks in 2024

Profile
- Position: Defensive lineman

Personal information
- Born: November 10, 2000 (age 25); Livingston, New Jersey, U.S.
- Listed height: 6 ft 4 in (1.93 m)
- Listed weight: 285 lb (129 kg)

Career information
- College: Lackawanna College
- CFL draft: 2024

Career history
- 2024: Edmonton Elks

Antonio Alfano (born November 10, 2000) is an American-Canadian professional football defensive tackle.

== Early life ==
Alfano was born on November 10, 2000, in Livingston, New Jersey. Raised in Rahway, New Jersey, Alfano attended the local public schools through eighth grade before enrolling at Bergen Catholic High School. He transferred to Rahway High School in his hometown, before moving from Rahway to the Avenel section of Woodbridge Township, New Jersey, and transferring to Colonia High School in New Jersey. As a senior, Alfano was a 5-star recruit and the fifth-ranked overall player in the class of 2019, and was named to the All-American team by MaxPreps. He received scholarship offers from Alabama, Notre Dame, Florida State, Florida, LSU, USC, Miami, Ohio State, Penn State, Rutgers and others.

== College career ==
As a freshman at Alabama, Alfano was absent from class and practices in September for unspecified reasons, though his father tweeted that his son's absence may have stemmed from Alfano's grandmother, who had been in ill health at the time. Alfano entered the NCAA transfer portal on September 13, 2019, and Colorado Buffaloes head coach (and former Alabama Crimson Tide defensive backs coach) Mel Tucker announced that Alfano transferred to Colorado on November 4, 2019. Alabama head coach Nick Saban addressed the player's time with the team by saying he "basically quit." He saw no playing time with the Crimson Tide.

Buffaloes head coach Mel Tucker had previously recruited Alfano to Georgia, where Tucker was the defensive coordinator at the time. One month after Alfano officially enrolled at Colorado, Tucker left to be the head coach at Michigan State University, while Alfano's position coach at Colorado, Jimmy Brumbaugh, also left the same week to take a coaching job at the University of Tennessee. On May 29, 2020, it was reported that Alfano left both Colorado and its football team. On August 19, 2020, Alfano was reinstated to the team.

Without playing a game at Colorado, Alfano transferred to Independence Community College, but never saw game action there, either. After a year out of football, he joined Lackawanna College in Pennsylvania, playing in five games with 14 tackles (eight for loss), four sacks, one pass knockdown and one forced fumble.

== Professional career ==
The Edmonton Elks drafted Alfano in the 2024 CFL supplemental draft. He obtained Canadian citizenship via his mother who is from Toronto but was not able to formally acquire it in time to be eligible for the 2024 CFL draft.
