= Olsen Pierre =

American football player (born 1991)

No. 72, 93
- Position: Defensive end

Personal information
- Born: August 27, 1991 (age 35); Rahway, New Jersey, U.S.
- Listed height: 6 ft 4 in (1.93 m)
- Listed weight: 293 lb (133 kg)

Career information
- High school: Rahway
- College: Miami (FL)
- NFL draft: 2015: undrafted

Career history
- Chicago Bears (2015)*; Arizona Cardinals (2015–2018); New York Giants (2019); Oakland Raiders (2019)
- * Offseason or practice squad member only

Career NFL statistics
- Total tackles: 42
- Sacks: 5.5
- Forced fumbles: 1
- Stats at Pro Football Reference

Olsen Pierre (born August 27, 1991) is an American former professional football player who was a defensive end in the National Football League (NFL). He played college football for the Miami Hurricanes.

== Early life ==
Pierre grew up in Rahway, New Jersey, and attended Rahway High School. He was a New York Giants fan during the height of Osi Umenyiora and the beginning of Jason Pierre-Paul’s pass-rushing careers. He admired the “go-getter” approach of Umenyiora, while Jason Pierre Paul like himself, are of Haitian descent which was also impressionable for him early on while pursuing a career in football.

== College career ==
Pierre started 36 of 40 games played at Miami (FL), notching 96 tackles, nine tackles for loss, 2.5 sacks, two forced fumbles, one fumble recovery and six passes defensed.

== Professional career ==
=== Chicago Bears ===
Pierre signed with the Chicago Bears as an undrafted free agent following the 2015 NFL draft. He was released on August 30, 2015.

=== Arizona Cardinals ===
Pierre was signed to Cardinals practice squad on October 21, 2015. On January 26, 2016, he was signed to a future contract.

On March 7, 2017, Pierre signed an exclusive rights tender with the Cardinals. On April 18, he signed a one-year contract. On October 1, 2017, he recorded his first career sack against the San Francisco 49ers. On November 9, he made his first career start, getting four tackles and a sack against the Seattle Seahawks. He recorded three more sacks to finish the 2017 season, all three in wins over the Jacksonville Jaguars, Tennessee Titans, and a strip-sack in the season finale against the Seahawks. He ended his season with 30 tackles, 5.5 sacks, 2 passes defensed, and a forced fumble in 14 games.

On April 3, 2018, Pierre re-signed with the Cardinals on a one-year contract. He played in 10 games before being placed on injured reserve on December 4, 2018, with a knee injury.

=== New York Giants ===
On March 15, 2019, Pierre was signed by the New York Giants. He was released on November 9.

=== Oakland Raiders ===
On December 11, 2019, Pierre was signed by the Oakland Raiders.
