= Rahway, New Jersey =

City in Union County, New Jersey, US

- City
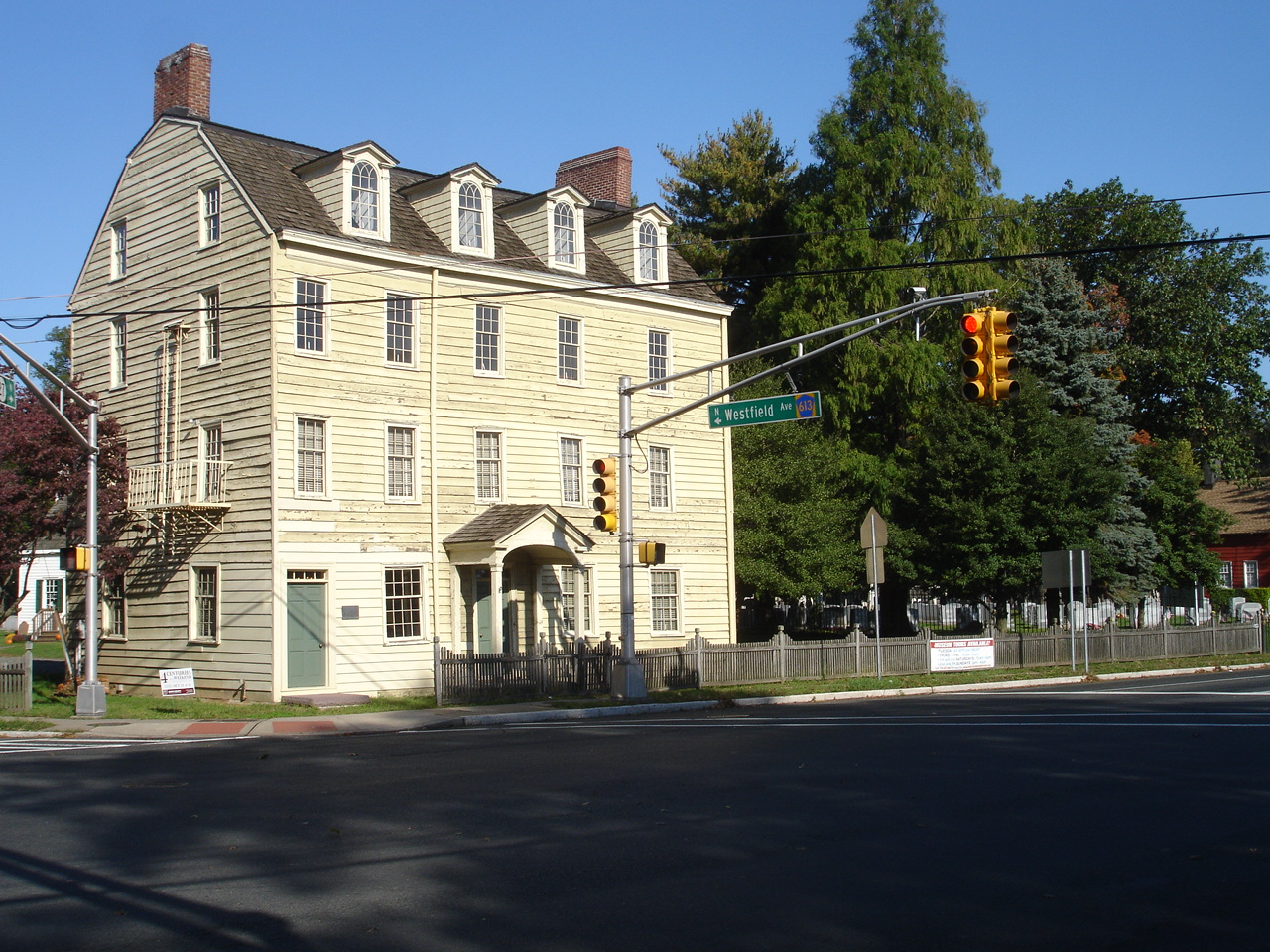
- The historic Merchants and Drovers Tavern

- Flag Seal

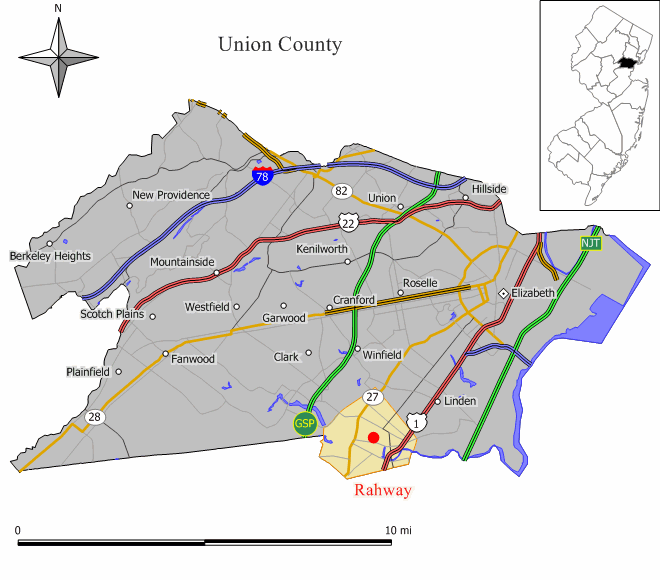
- Location of Rahway in Union County, New Jersey (left). Inset map: Location of Union County in New Jersey.

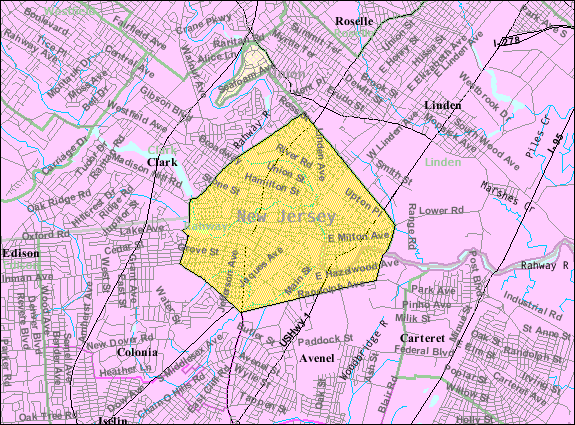
- Census Bureau map of Rahway, New Jersey
- Interactive map of Rahway, New Jersey
- Location in Union County Location in New Jersey Location in the United States
- Coordinates: 40.607152°N 74.280531°W
- Country: United States
- State: New Jersey
- County: Union
- Incorporated: April 19, 1858

Government
  - Type: Faulkner Act (mayor–council)
  - Body: City Council
  - Mayor: Raymond A. Giacobbe Jr. (D, term ends December 31, 2026)
  - Business administrator: Matthew Pukavich
  - Municipal clerk: Heather Capone

Area
  - Total: 4.04 sq mi (10.47 km^{2})
  - Land: 3.90 sq mi (10.09 km^{2})
  - Water: 0.15 sq mi (0.38 km^{2}) 3.59%
  - Rank: 295th of 565 in state 12th of 21 in county
- Elevation: 23 ft (7.0 m)

Population (2020)
  - Total: 29,556
  - Estimate (2023): 29,813
  - Rank: 81st of 565 in state 6th of 21 in county
  - Density: 7,586.2/sq mi (2,929.0/km^{2})
  - Rank: 58th of 565 in state 7th of 21 in county
- Time zone: UTC−05:00 (Eastern Standard Time (EST))
  - Summer (DST): UTC−04:00 (Eastern (EDT))
- ZIP Code: 07065
- Area code: 732
- FIPS code: 3403961530
- GNIS feature ID: 0885363
- Website: cityofrahway.com

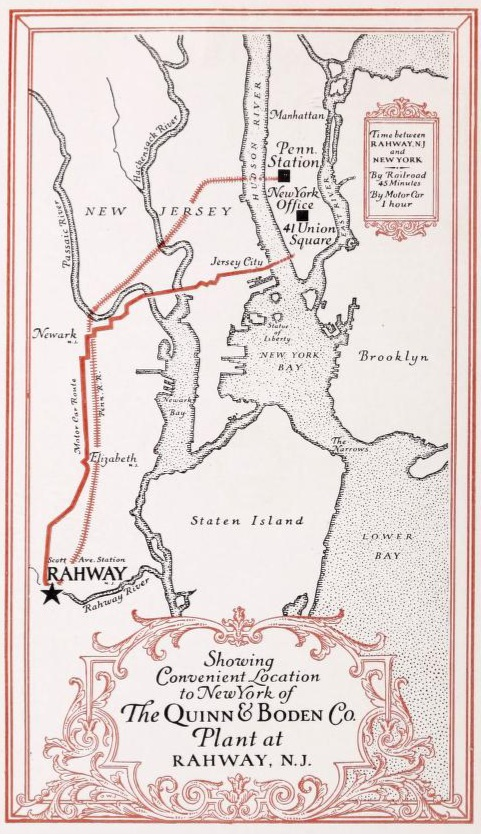
Location map of Rahway from 1922. The present-day ride to New York by train is typically 38 minutes.

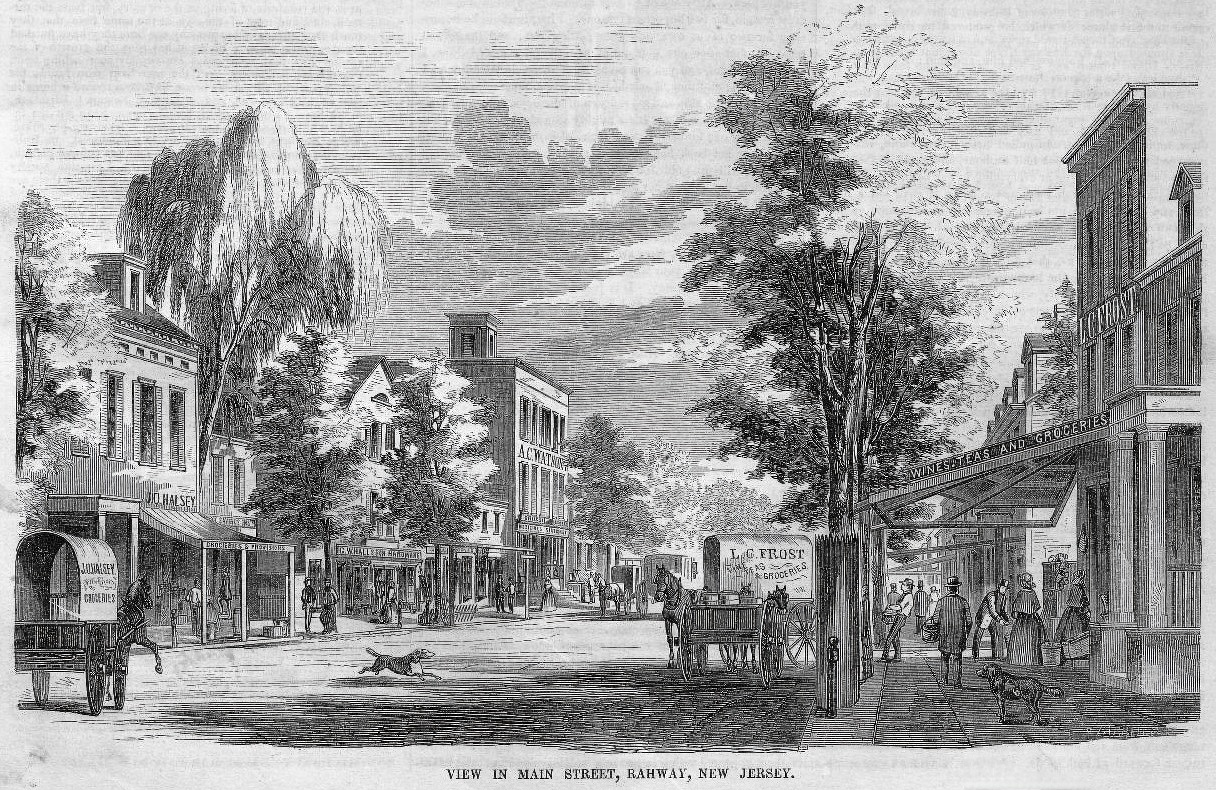
An engraving from 1857 of Main Street in Rahway from Ballou's Pictorial Drawing-Room Companion.

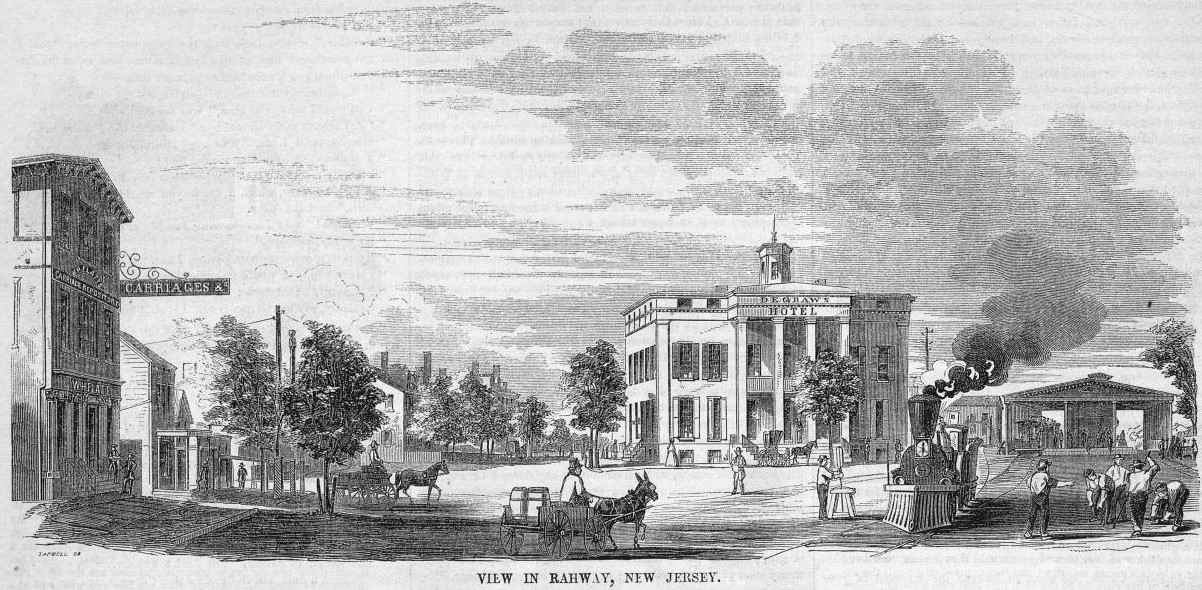
The Rahway rail station as it was depicted by an artist in 1857. Flatt's carriage warehouse is at left and Degraw's Hotel is center.

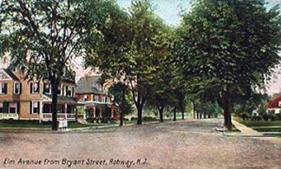
Elm Avenue, looking west, c. early 1900s

Rahway (/ˈrɔːweɪ/) is a city in southern Union County, in the U.S. state of New Jersey. A bedroom community of New York City, it is centrally located in the Rahway Valley region, in the New York metropolitan area. The city is 15 miles (24 km) southwest of Manhattan and 5 miles (8.0 km) west of Staten Island.

Built on the navigable Rahway River, it was an industrial and artisanal craft city for much of its history. The city has increasingly reinvented itself in recent years as a diverse regional hub for the arts and biological sciences, with a new global headquarters for Merck & Co.

As of the 2020 United States census, the city's population was 29,556, its highest decennial count ever and an increase of 2,210 (+8.1%) from the 27,346 recorded at the 2010 census, which in turn reflected an increase of 846 (+3.2%) from the 26,500 counted in the 2000 census.

== History ==
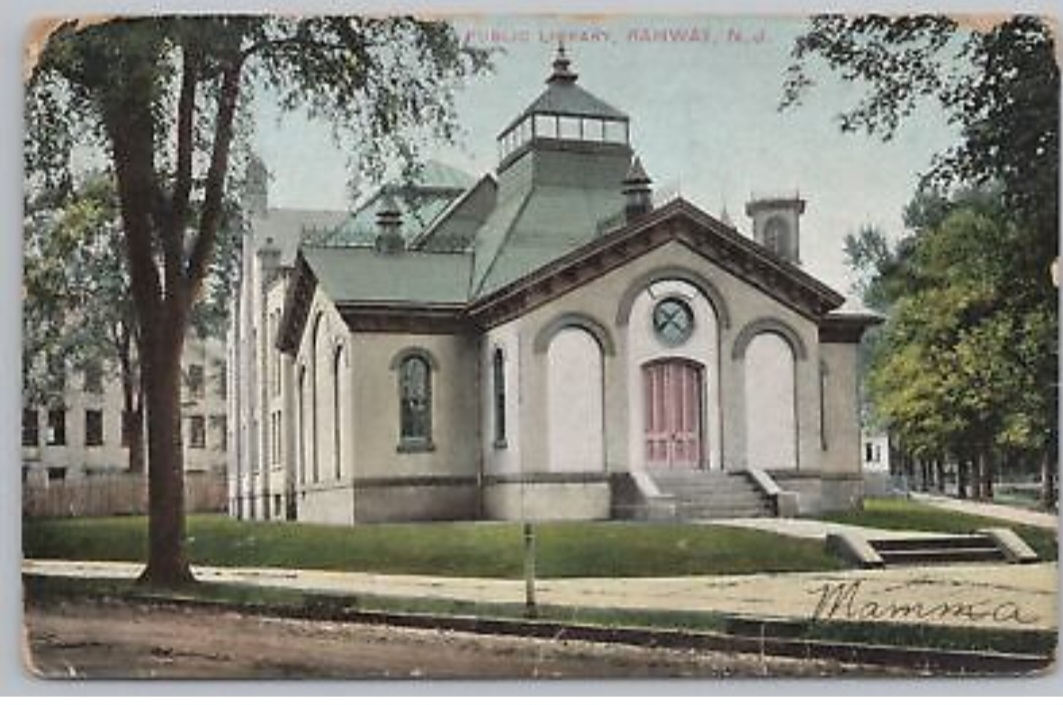
The old Rahway library. Built in 1869, the building is now home to an art gallery, The Gallery Space.

=== Indigenous presence ===
Rahway and the surrounding area were once the home of the Lenape Native Americans, and tradition states that the city was named after Rahwack (or Ra-wa-rah), a local tribal chief.

=== English colonization ===
Formal European colonization began in 1664 with the purchase by the English from the Lenape of the Elizabethtown Tract, which encompassed lands from the mouth of the Raritan River and included all of present-day Union County as well as parts of Somerset, Middlesex, Morris and Essex counties. The early settlers of Elizabethtown and Woodbridge were the founders of Rahway which began as outlying acreage and plantations. The Seventeenth Century Clark House is one of the oldest buildings in the state.

By the 18th century, Rahway consisted of four distinct communities: Upper Rahway, Bridge Town (or Lower Rahway), Leesville, and Milton.

=== Revolutionary War and the Battle of Spanktown ===
Rahway saw action during the American Revolutionary War because of its proximity to Staten Island, Elizabethtown and Perth Amboy. In January 1777, rebels were victorious against the British in the Battle of Spanktown, which resulted in the death of some 100 British troops. The battle was named this after Rahway's original name given to it by the first settlers, Spanktown, which is said to have been chosen "because an early settler publicly took his spouse across his knee and chastised her". Spanktown was mentioned in Revolutionary War military dispatches from January 5, 1777, through March 14, 1782.

The Merchants and Drovers Tavern is located at the corner of St. Georges and Westfield Avenues. The earliest buildings at the site date to 1795 and the property remains one of Rahway's most prominent historical landmarks. George Washington visited Rahway during his travel to New York City prior to his presidential inauguration in 1789. A marker across the street from the tavern reads:

Here, on April 23, 1789, on his way to New York City, Washington was received by troops from Elizabethtown and Newark. He was entertained at the inn kept by Samuel Smith by gentlemen of the town.

Following the Revolution, Rahway became the home of the first national mint to create a coin bearing the inscription E pluribus unum. A United States Post Office established in Rahway was one of only six in the entire state in 1791.

Various historical place markers in town document Rahway Revolutionary War history.

=== Stagecoach era and corporate growth ===
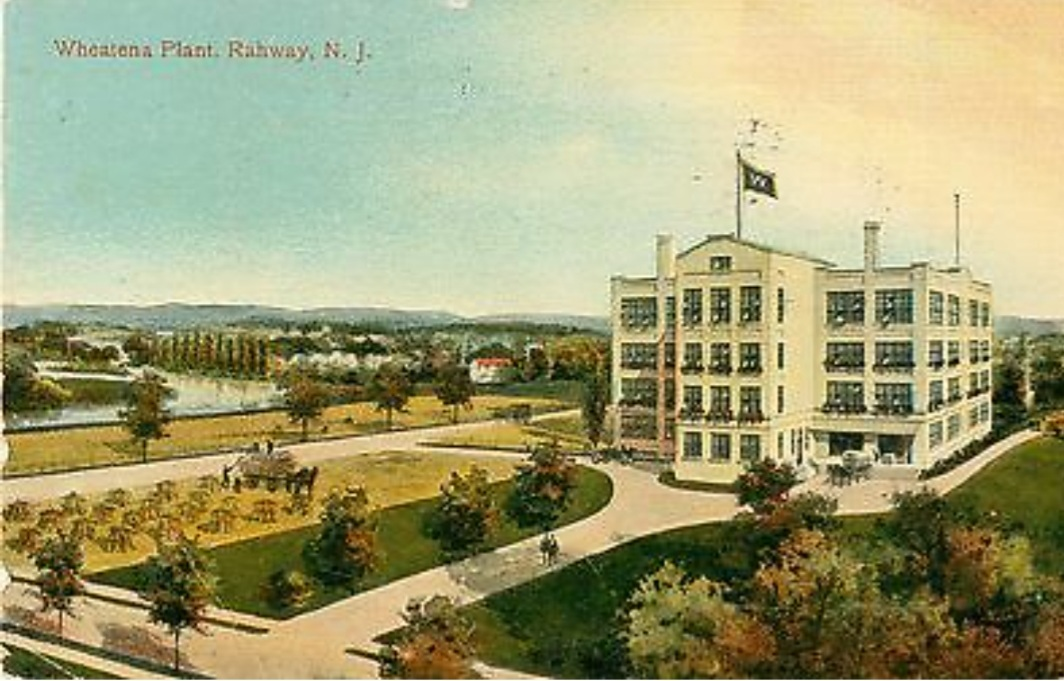
The Wheatena breakfast cereal plant in 1923, with the Rahway River at left. The brand promoted a popular radio series starring Raymond Knight: "Wheatenaville, the Rahway factory complex, transformed into Wheatenaville, the 1930s radio serial about a perfect family in a perfect town that ate Wheatena for strength and prosperity."

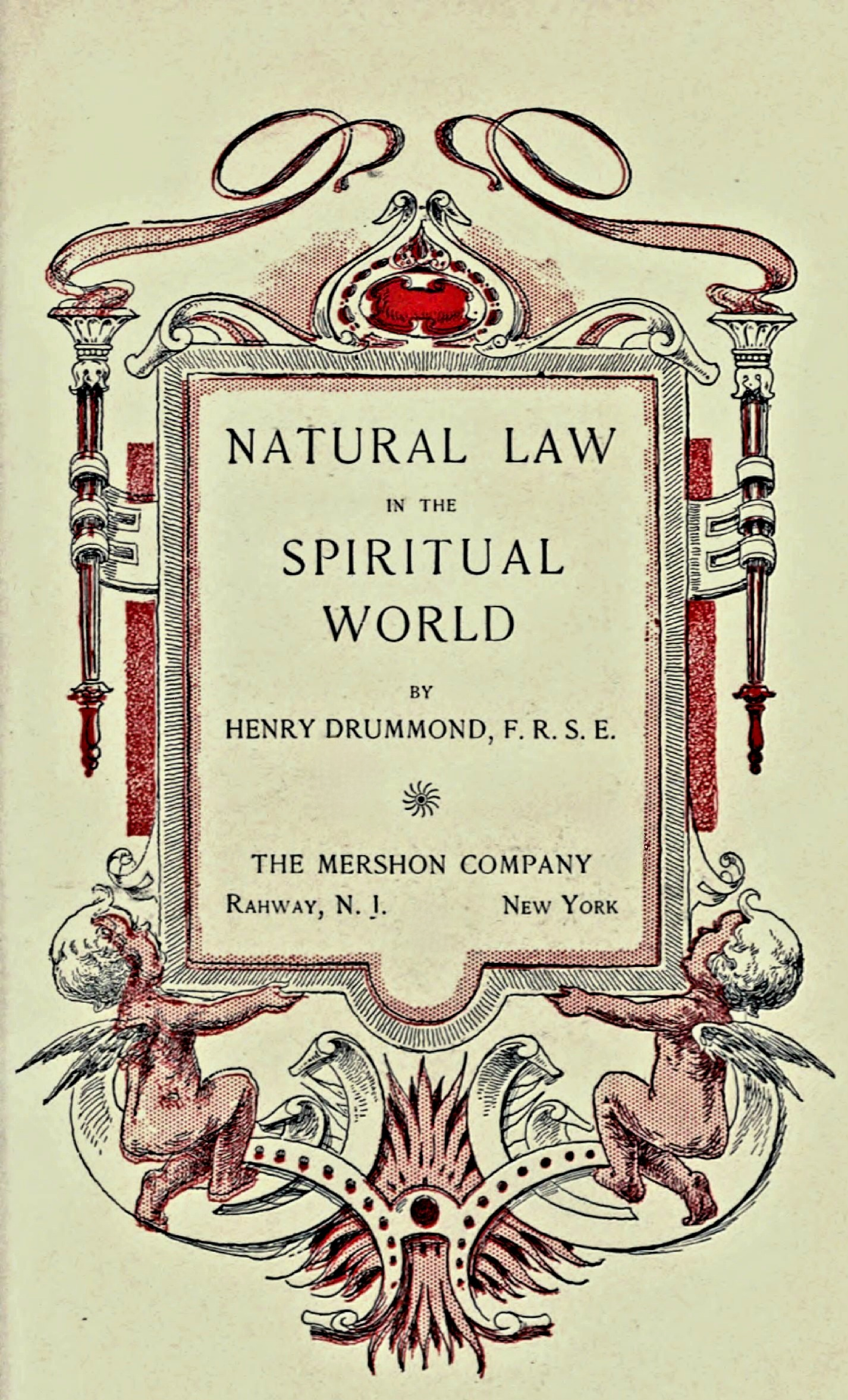
The title page of a work by Henry Drummond and published by the Mershon Company of Rahway, which began as bookbinder W. L. Mershon & Co. in 1877 and became a book publisher in the 1890s.

Rahway grew due to its location along the major stagecoach and railroad lines between New York City and Philadelphia, Pennsylvania. The navigable Rahway River, which flows through the city, also aided the city's commercial growth.

As immigrants from Britain, Ireland and Germany streamed into what was then Rahway Township in the 1850s, Rahway became incorporated as a city by an act of the State Legislature on April 19, 1858, from portions of Rahway Township in Union County and Woodbridge Township in Middlesex County. In 1860, the portion of Rahway that had been part of Middlesex County was transferred to Union County. On March 13, 1861, the remainder of Rahway Township became part of Rahway City. Clark Township was formed from portions of the city on March 23, 1864.

The first municipal elections for the mayor and council were conducted on April 19, 1858, and the council held its first meeting on May 3, 1858. The city's police department and its initial group of four constables were created at that first council meeting.

The city became home to dozens of major manufacturers, including the Regina Music Box Company, Wheatena, Mershon Bros. and, most importantly, Merck & Co., which was established in Rahway in 1903, when George W. Merck moved his small chemical company to Rahway from New York City.

=== Postwar era ===
The national decline in industry after World War II led to the closure of most of Rahway's major manufacturing facilities (except for Merck) and a general deterioration of the city's central business district.

=== Revitalization ===
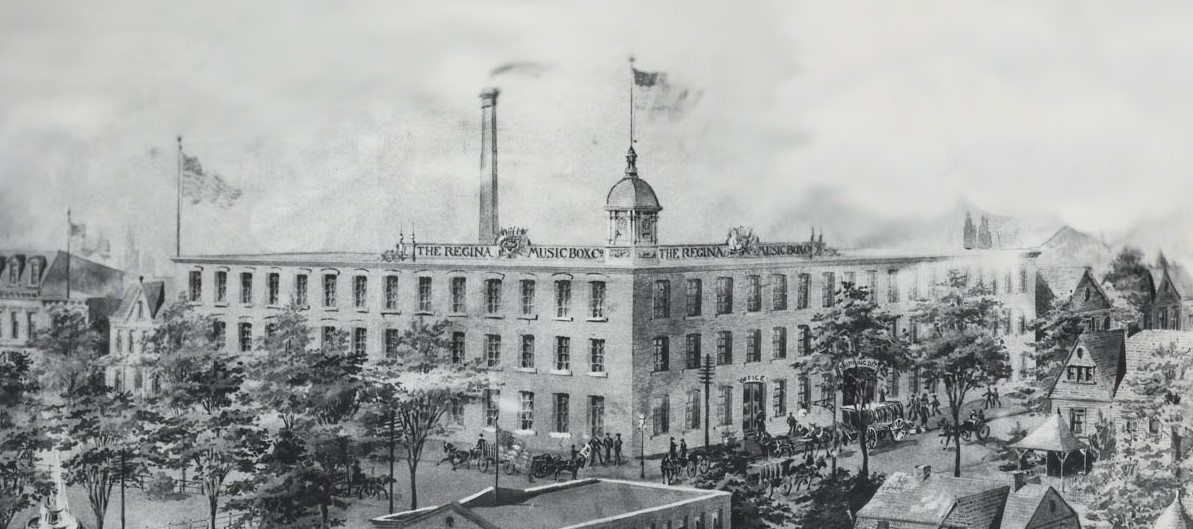
The Regina Music Box Company at 54 Cherry Street Rahway in 1895. The former factory building has been converted to the Heritage Square condos.

Beginning in the late 1990s, the city launched a plan to revitalize the downtown area and authorized the construction of hundreds of new market-rate housing units, a hotel, art galleries and additional retail space.

== Geography ==
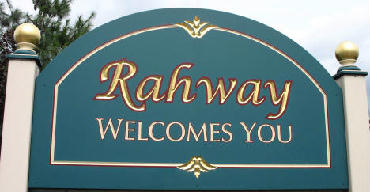
The Rahway welcome sign

According to the United States Census Bureau, the city had a total area of 4.04 square miles (10.47 km^{2}), including 3.90 square miles (10.09 km^{2}) of land and 0.15 square miles (0.38 km^{2}) of water (3.59%).

Rahway is bordered by the municipalities of Clark to the northwest and Linden to the northeast in Union County; and by Woodbridge Township to the south in Middlesex County.

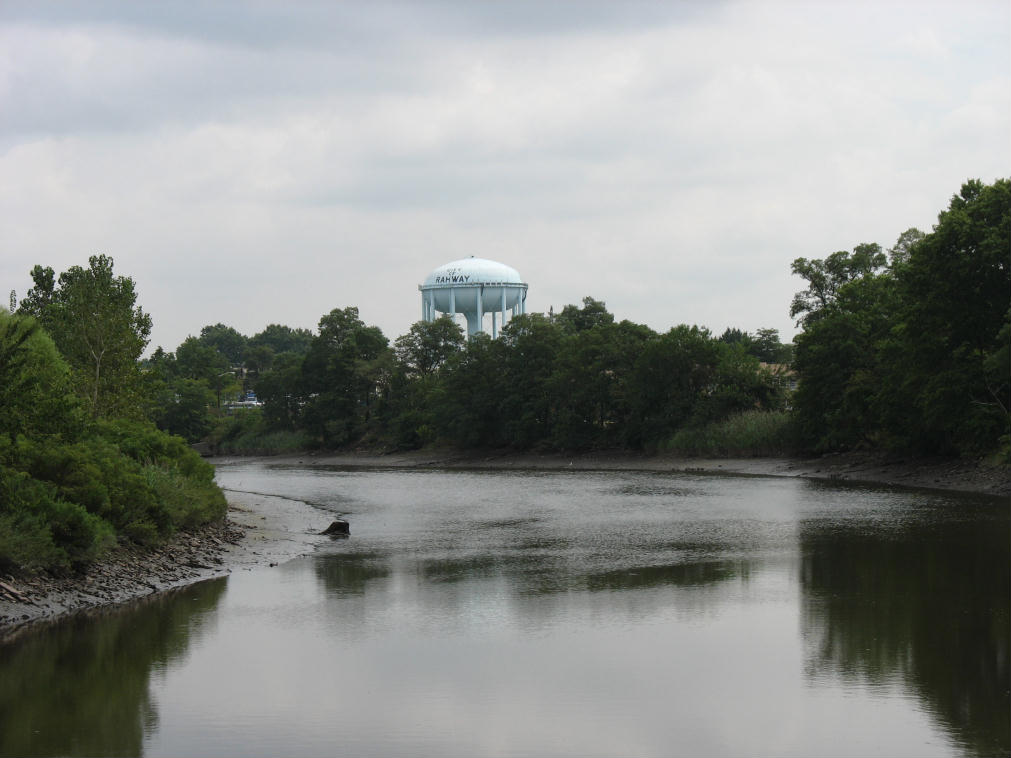
Rahway River and water tower

The Rahway River travels through Rahway, entering from Clark at Rahway River Parkway. The river receives the waters of Robinsons Branch at Elizabeth Avenue between West Grand Avenue and West Main Street, and then receives the waters of the South Branch at East Hazlewood Avenue and Leesville Avenue. The river leaves Rahway at the city limits of Linden and Woodbridge Township before flowing into the Arthur Kill.

Unincorporated communities, localities and place names located partially or completely within the city include Inman Heights and North Rahway.

== Demographics ==
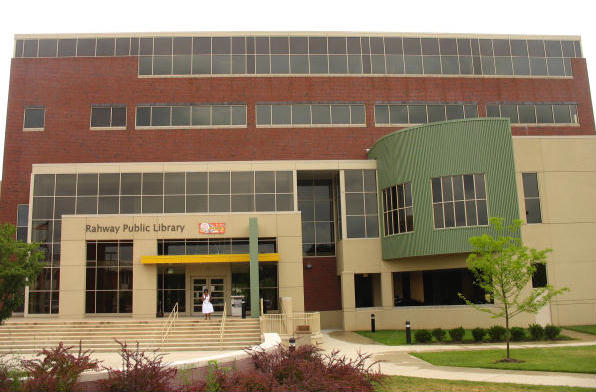
The current Rahway Public Library

Historical population
Census	Pop.	Note	%±
1860	7,130		—
1870	6,258	*	−12.2%
1880	6,455		3.1%
1890	7,105		10.1%
1900	7,935		11.7%
1910	9,337		17.7%
1920	11,042		18.3%
1930	16,011		45.0%
1940	17,498		9.3%
1950	21,290		21.7%
1960	27,699		30.1%
1970	29,114		5.1%
1980	26,723		−8.2%
1990	25,325		−5.2%
2000	26,500		4.6%
2010	27,346		3.2%
2020	29,556		8.1%
2023 (est.)	29,813		0.9%
Population sources: 1860–1920; 1860–1960 1860–1870 1870; 1890–1910 1860–1930; 1900–1990 2000; 2010 2020 * = Lost territory in previous decade.

=== Racial and ethnic composition ===
Rahway city, New Jersey – Racial and ethnic composition Note: the US Census treats Hispanic/Latino as an ethnic category. This table excludes Latinos from the racial categories and assigns them to a separate category. Hispanics/Latinos may be of any race.
Race / Ethnicity (NH = Non-Hispanic)	Pop 2000	Pop 2010	Pop 2020	% 2000	% 2010	% 2020
White alone (NH)	14,099	11,013	8,913	53.20%	40.27%	30.16%
Black or African American alone (NH)	7,058	8,104	8,892	26.63%	29.64%	30.09%
Native American or Alaska Native alone (NH)	34	42	40	0.13%	0.15%	0.14%
Asian alone (NH)	925	1,148	1,622	3.49%	4.20%	5.49%
Native Hawaiian or Pacific Islander alone (NH)	12	3	4	0.05%	0.01%	0.01%
Other race alone (NH)	108	82	228	0.41%	0.30%	0.77%
Mixed race or Multiracial (NH)	589	521	990	2.22%	1.91%	3.35%
Hispanic or Latino (any race)	3,675	6,433	8,867	13.87%	23.52%	30.00%
Total	26,500	27,346	29,556	100.00%	100.00%	100.00%

=== 2020 census ===
As of the 2020 census, Rahway had a population of 29,556. The median age was 39.3 years. 19.5% of residents were under the age of 18 and 15.1% of residents were 65 years of age or older. For every 100 females there were 91.2 males, and for every 100 females age 18 and over there were 88.3 males age 18 and over.

100.0% of residents lived in urban areas, while 0.0% lived in rural areas.

There were 11,544 households in Rahway, of which 28.8% had children under the age of 18 living in them. Of all households, 41.0% were married-couple households, 19.1% were households with a male householder and no spouse or partner present, and 32.9% were households with a female householder and no spouse or partner present. About 29.9% of all households were made up of individuals and 11.7% had someone living alone who was 65 years of age or older.

There were 12,363 housing units, of which 6.6% were vacant. The homeowner vacancy rate was 1.8% and the rental vacancy rate was 6.9%.

Racial composition as of the 2020 census
Race	Number	Percent
White	10,155	34.4%
Black or African American	9,343	31.6%
American Indian and Alaska Native	229	0.8%
Asian	1,649	5.6%
Native Hawaiian and Other Pacific Islander	7	0.0%
Some other race	4,218	14.3%
Two or more races	3,955	13.4%
Hispanic or Latino (of any race)	8,867	30.0%

=== 2010 census ===
The 2010 United States census counted 27,346 people, 10,533 households, and 6,815 families in the city. The population density was 7,016.8 per square mile (2,709.2/km^{2}). There were 11,300 housing units at an average density of 2,899.5 per square mile (1,119.5/km^{2}). The racial makeup was 52.30% (14,301) White, 30.93% (8,457) Black or African American, 0.31% (84) Native American, 4.30% (1,175) Asian, 0.02% (5) Pacific Islander, 8.37% (2,288) from other races, and 3.79% (1,036) from two or more races. Hispanic or Latino of any race were 23.52% (6,433) of the population.

Of the 10,533 households, 28.1% had children under the age of 18; 42.4% were married couples living together; 16.8% had a female householder with no husband present and 35.3% were non-families. Of all households, 29.5% were made up of individuals and 11.2% had someone living alone who was 65 years of age or older. The average household size was 2.58 and the average family size was 3.23.

21.8% of the population were under the age of 18, 8.5% from 18 to 24, 28.6% from 25 to 44, 27.5% from 45 to 64, and 13.5% who were 65 years of age or older. The median age was 38.8 years. For every 100 females, the population had 91.1 males. For every 100 females ages 18 and older there were 87.1 males.

The Census Bureau's 2006–2010 American Community Survey showed that (in 2010 inflation-adjusted dollars) median household income was $58,551 (with a margin of error of +/− $3,355) and the median family income was $77,268 (+/− $9,506). Males had a median income of $56,572 (+/− $3,375) versus $47,832 (+/− $3,542) for females. The per capita income for the city was $28,855 (+/− $1,981). About 5.4% of families and 8.7% of the population were below the poverty line, including 10.9% of those under age 18 and 9.4% of those age 65 or over.

=== 2000 census ===
As of the 2000 United States census there were 26,500 people, 10,028 households, and 6,728 families residing in the city. The population density was 6,642.7 inhabitants per square mile (2,564.8/km^{2}). There were 10,381 housing units at an average density of 2,602.2 per square mile (1,004.7/km^{2}). The racial makeup of the city was 60.19% White, 27.07% African American, 0.16% Native American, 3.58% Asian, 0.05% Pacific Islander, 5.62% from other races, and 3.33% from two or more races. Hispanic or Latino people of any race were 13.87% of the population.

There were 10,028 households, out of which 30.0% had children under the age of 18 living with them, 46.7% were married couples living together, 15.6% had a female householder with no husband present, and 32.9% were non-families. 28.0% of all households were made up of individuals, and 11.7% had someone living alone who was 65 years of age or older. The average household size was 2.63 and the average family size was 3.24.

In the city the population was spread out, with 23.9% under the age of 18, 7.8% from 18 to 24, 32.0% from 25 to 44, 21.8% from 45 to 64, and 14.5% who were 65 years of age or older. The median age was 37 years. For every 100 females, there were 91.2 males. For every 100 females age 18 and over, there were 86.5 males.

The median income for a household in the city was $50,729, and the median income for a family was $61,931. Males had a median income of $41,047 versus $32,091 for females. The per capita income for the city was $22,481. About 5.4% of families and 7.1% of the population were below the poverty line, including 9.3% of those under age 18 and 8.2% of those age 65 or over.

== Economy ==
=== Downtown ===
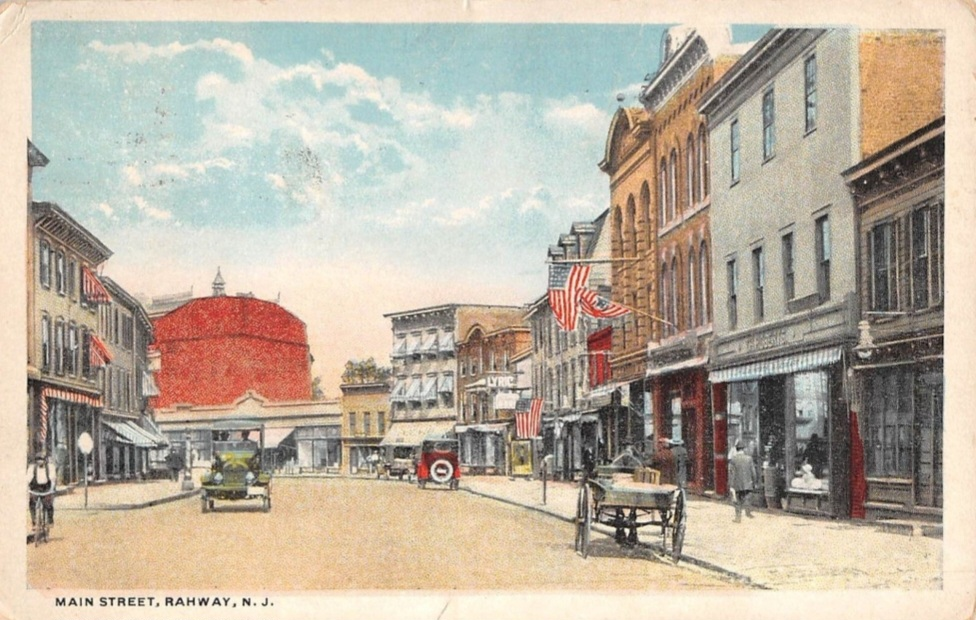
Main Street in 1920. The red storefront third down from the right is now cigar lounge Sticks Cigars. The arched-top building to its right (1519 Main) is now home to Fork, an American restaurant and cocktail bar that opened in 2025. The building across the street at the corner of Cherry (1510 Main) is now a seafood market.

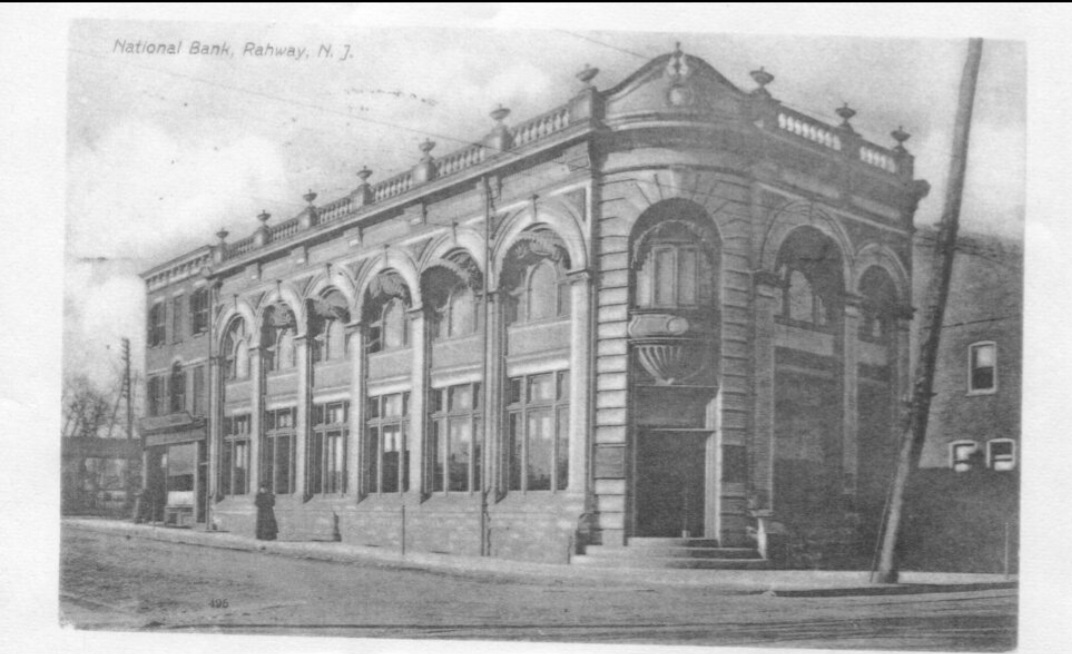
The Rahway National Bank, built in 1900 and renovated for office, retail, and restaurant space in the 2020s as The National building.

In 2020, downtown Rahway received accolades as a Great Downtown by the American Planning Association:

"Downtown Rahway is a great place. It is a place that emphasizes livability, walkability, shopping, food, art, diversity and a destination. Centered in the heart of the bustling City of Rahway, next to the NJ Transit Station, Rahway's downtown is the building block for this diverse city."

In 2019, the Watt Hotel opened across from the train station, with 100 rooms managed by Hilton on the third and fourth floors of a 17-story building, a lobby cocktail lounge and a rooftop terrace with a seasonal bar offering views of the city, river and outwards to the Watchung Mountains.

Beginning in the early 1990s and continuing through the present day, the City of Rahway has rebounded as its downtown began to see the construction of new restaurants, art galleries, market-rate housing and the old Rahway Theatre reopening as the Union County Performing Arts Center. The theater underwent a $6.2-million renovation and expansion project, completed in 2007. As part of the expansion, the facility was purchased by the County of Union for $1.3 million and leased back for $1 a year.

=== Robert Wood Johnson University Hospital, Rahway ===
Robert Wood Johnson University Hospital, Rahway, formerly Rahway Hospital, is a 122-bed non-profit, public, research and academic teaching hospital located in Rahway. The medical center is a part of the RWJBarnabas Health System. It is affiliated with the Robert Wood Johnson Medical School. It also has an emergency department for area residents.

=== Merck & Co. ===
In 2021, Merck & Co. announced that it would be returning its global headquarters to its Rahway research campus (currently the largest private employer in Rahway) and former headquarters. In 2024, Merck completed the move of headquarters to Rahway.

== Arts and culture ==
=== Local news media ===
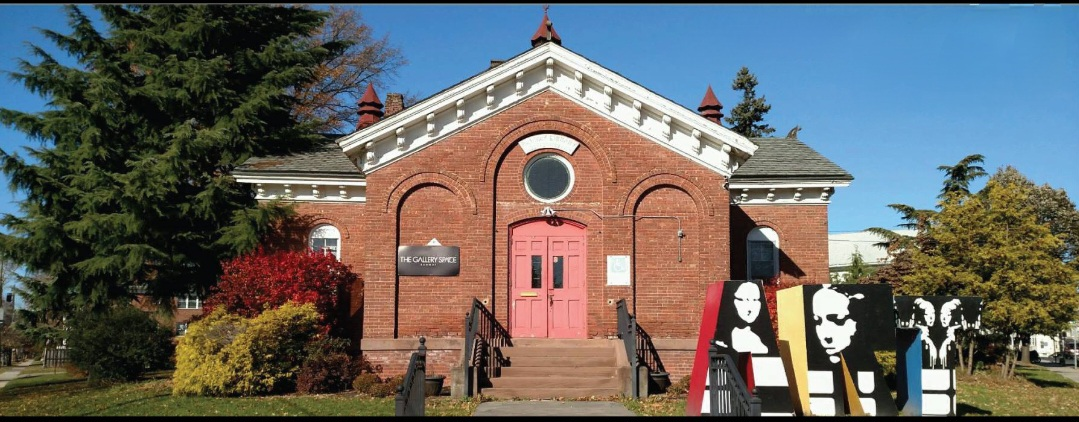
The Gallery Space, an art gallery in Rahway. The building was erected in 1869 as the Rahway library and is the second oldest building in New Jersey specifically built as a library.

- TAPInto Rahway is a local news site covering Rahway news exclusively, part of the TAPinto network of news in Central and Northern New Jersey.
- Rahway Rising is a longstanding news site run by the former editor of the now-defunct newspaper The Rahway Progress and covering city council meetings with a focus on redevelopment.
- Rahway Is Happening! is the news release arm of the Rahway Special Improvement District, announcing and promoting the arts, festivals, dining, shopping, new and established local businesses, and other downtown culture.
- Our Town Rahway is a free monthly community newspaper mailed out to residents and published by Renna Media.
- Union News Daily. A news outlet covering Union County news, it has a dedicated Rahway section. It is part of LocalSource and published by Worrall Community Newspapers of Union.
- Remaining multi-community newspapers that cover Rahway include the Courier News, a daily newspaper based in Bridgewater Township, and The Star-Ledger and the Suburban News based in Newark.

=== Library and other media ===
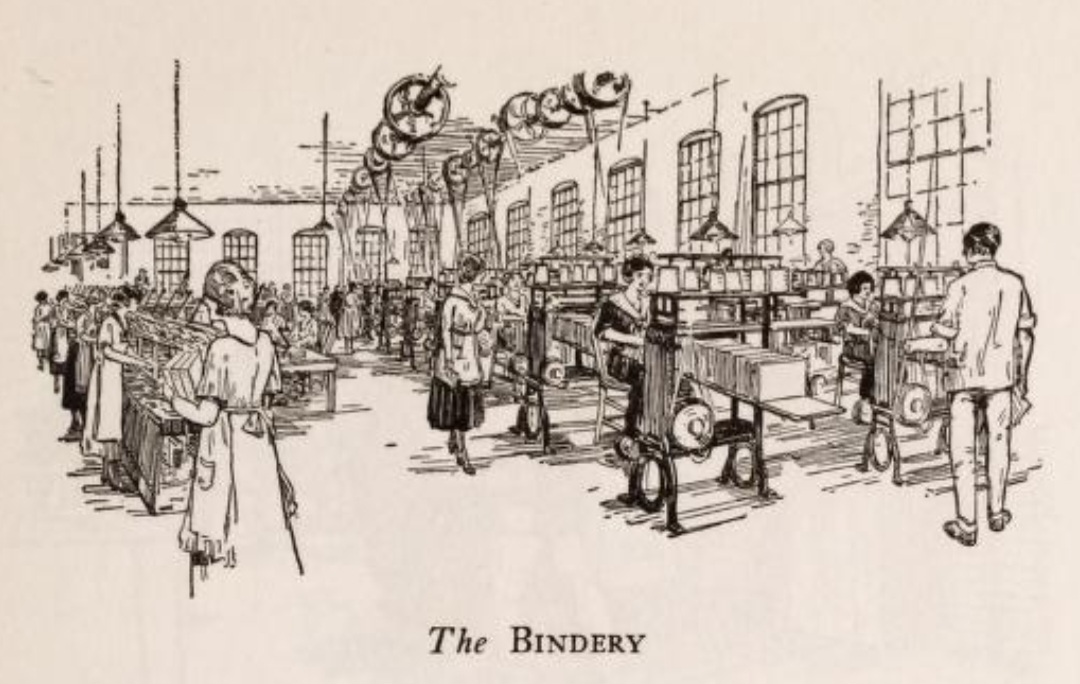
The book bindery room at Quinn & Boden Company in Rahway in the early 1920s.

In September 1999, remnants of Hurricane Floyd swept across New Jersey and caused severe damage. The Rahway Public Library was on a flood plain and suffered over $1 million in flood damage. The building was demolished in October 2001 and a new library was constructed and opened on March 22, 2004, behind the city's municipal building along a less flood-prone area of the Rahway River. The site of the former Rahway Public Library now contains tennis courts and a small playground. The new library opened in 2004.

Historian and Rahway native Eva Bridges opened the city's Black-owned bookstore, Bridges Book Center Afro-American Research Library & Museum, located at 1480 Main Street, in 1970.

=== Performing and visual arts ===
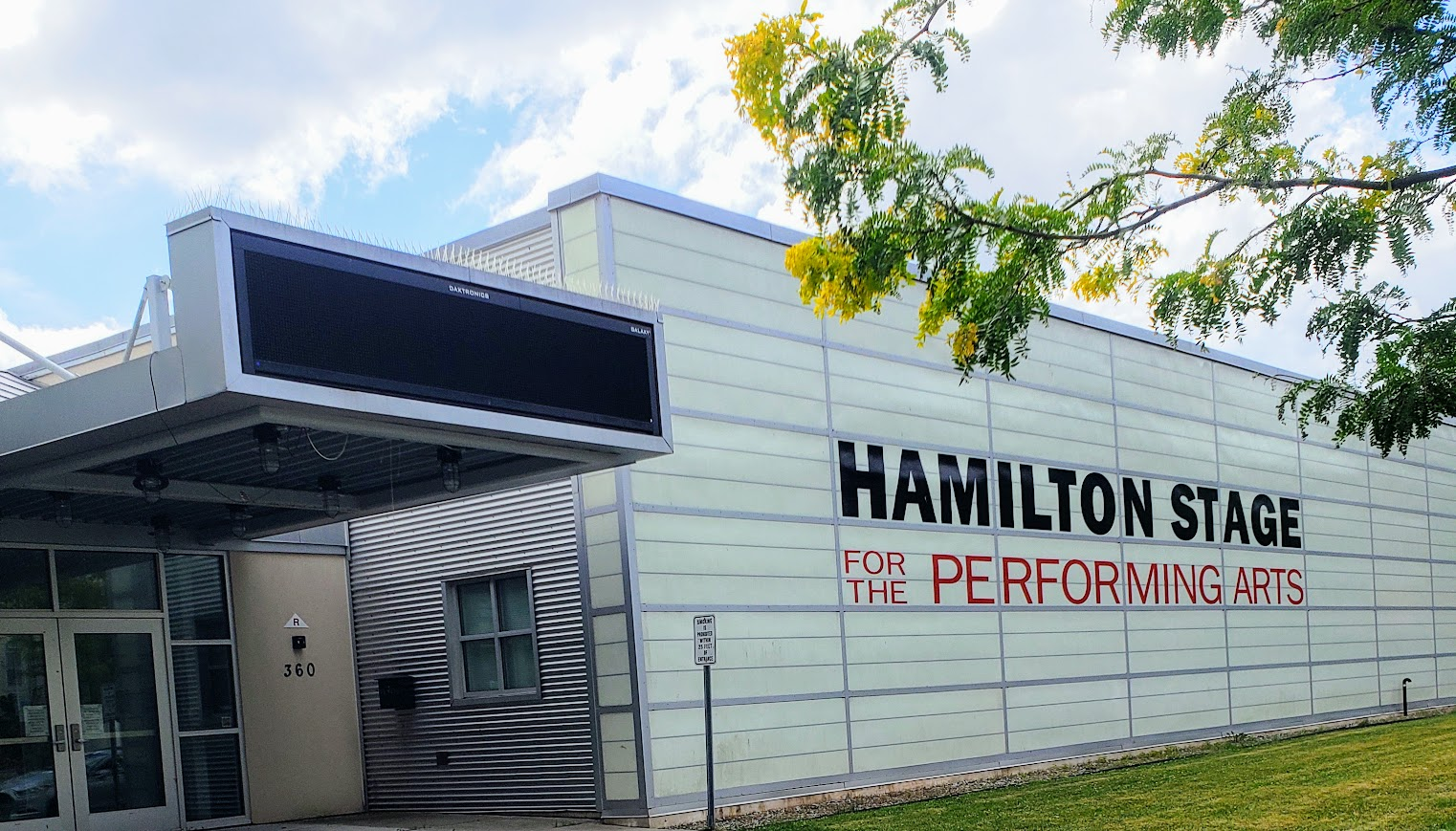
Hamilton Stage for the Performing Arts at UCPAC in Rahway

As of the 2020s, downtown Rahway has become a regional hub in the performing and visual arts. A 2026 article described Rahway's arts and cultural scene as continuing to grow, alongside its restaurant scene and year-round community events.

The landmarked Rahway Theatre building is home to the Union County Performing Arts Center.

=== Murals and public art ===
The Rahway cityscape has seen several new murals and public art installations in recent years, created by both local and international artists.

In 2025, a large-scale building-wrap mural by the artist James McMenamin of Glossblack LLC, titled Greetings from Rahway, was unveiled at Rahway Train Station Plaza on the former Rahway National Bank. The mural also depicts inventor Nikola Tesla, who opened Tesla Electric Light & Manufacturing in Victorian-era Rahway, pulling a string to light up the lettering.

Muralist Porkchop painted Mermaid, a green mermaid mural along the Paseo, an outdoor plaza area downtown between buildings, in honor of the Rahway River.

Another mural on Cherry Street, River Goddess, by artist Key Detail, depicts a female character surrounded by aquatic animals seen in the Rahway River watershed, including a diamondback terrapin, snapping turtle, fiddler crab and species of fish.

In 2024, a 1,500-square-foot (140 m^{2}) work by muralist DISTORT, titled Rahway, Home to Innovation, was unveiled to honor three scientists with ties to the city: Tesla, Carl Sagan, and Jeannette Brown.

That same year, Peruvian artist Jade Rivera created a mural, La Florista, outside Peruvian restaurant Quilla by Sabor Peruano on Irving Street. The piece incorporates Andean flora, fauna, and a crescent moon representing Mama Quilla, the Incan moon goddess. The project was supported in part by the Rahway Special Improvement District and unveiled with city officials and Peruvian Consulate representatives in attendance.

Also located on Irving Street is Native Botanicals by local artist Emilio Florentine, a 2023 mural celebrating regional plant life.

On the corner of Main Street and the Paseo, Lawrence Ciarallo’s The Wings, painted in 2018, remains one of Rahway’s most photographed murals, with large, colorful wings inviting visitors to pose between them.

=== Houses of worship ===
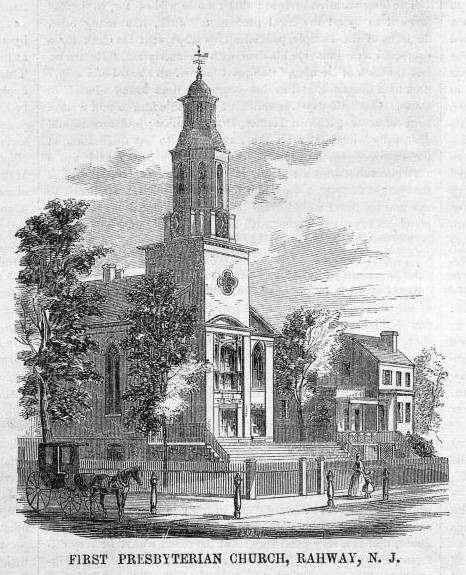
The First Presbyterian Church of Rahway in an engraving from 1857, looking much the same as it does today.

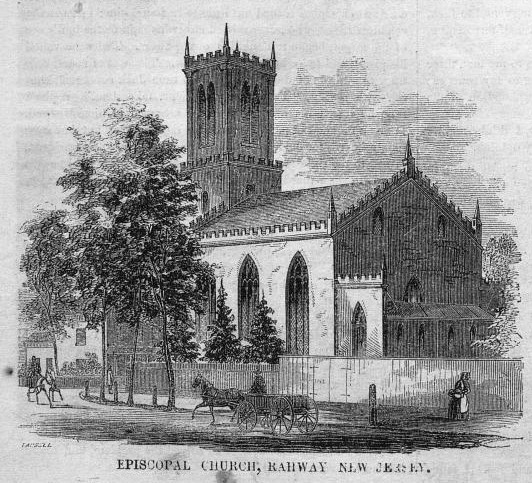
An engraving from 1857 of St. Paul's Church at 80 Elm Street, erected in 1842. The church is the present-day home to the Word of Life congregation.

- The First Presbyterian Church of Rahway was established in 1741 and its current church on Grand and Church Street was built in 1832. It was extensively remodeled in 1876.
- Divine Mercy Parish is a Roman Catholic community of faith in Rahway. Its church on Central Avenue was built in 1888 by Irish architect Jeremiah O'Rourke. It was formerly known as St. Mary's Roman Catholic Church, which was merged by the Archdiocese with the former St. Mark's German Catholic Church around 2010 to form Divine Mercy Parish. It offers Mass and parish activities as part of the Archdiocese of Newark.
- Built in 1865, the Seventh-day Adventist Church stands at the intersection of Main Street and West Emerson (1221 New Brunswick Avenue). It was formerly the Second Presbyterian, but that congregation merged with the First Presbyterian in 2012.
- Established in 1826, the Ebenezer AME Church in Rahway is one of the oldest African Methodist Episcopal church in the country
- Trinity Methodist. Founded in 1849, this Methodist group was called Second Methodist. In 1893, the group changed its name to Trinity United Methodist and built the large brick, Romanesque-styled church on the corner of E. Milton Avenue and Main Street.

== Parks and recreation ==
=== City parks ===
The city is home to more than ten parks. The best known is Rahway River Park, which is maintained by Union County, and is also partially located in Clark. The Robinson's Branch Reservoir abuts the city at the Madison Hill Bridge on the Clark-Rahway border.

=== The pool at Rahway River Park ===
The Walter E. Ulrich swimming pool in Rahway River Park was extensively renovated and retiled in 2021. A beach-style splash feature for children, with an "ocean-like" sloping entry without stairs, was added to the pool that year. The pool is available to Union County residents and their guests for a daily fee. Built in 1929, it was documented by the Historic American Engineering Record in 1985.

== Government ==
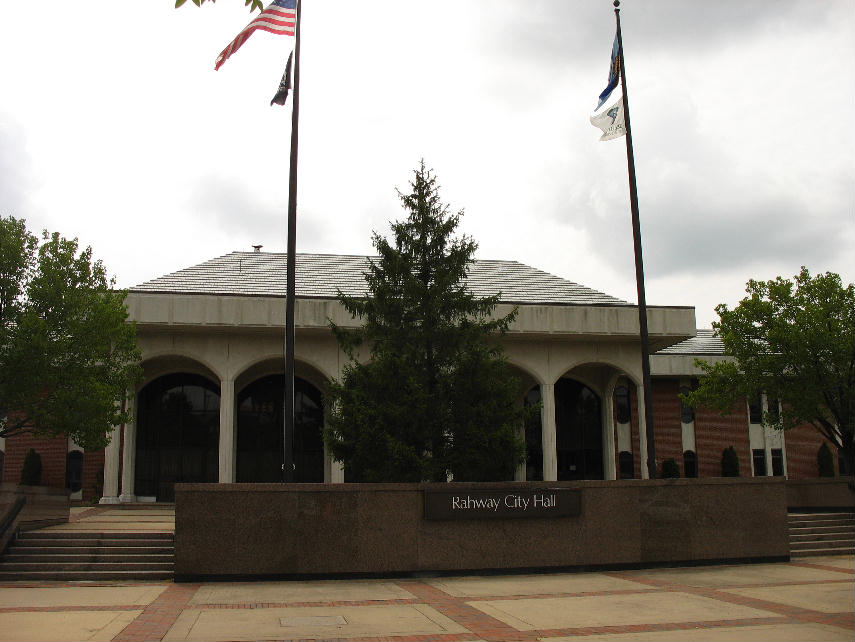
Rahway City Hall

=== Local government ===
The City of Rahway is governed under the Faulkner Act system of municipal government under the Mayor-Council (Plan F), implemented as of January 1, 1955, based on the recommendations of a Charter Study Commission. The township is one of 71 municipalities (of the 564) statewide that use this form of government. The city's governing body is comprised of the Mayor and the nine-member City Council. The Mayor is elected directly by the voters. The City Council includes nine members, all elected to four-year terms of office. Six members of the council are elected from each of six wards. The other three members are elected to represent the entire city on an at-large basis. Elections are in even-numbered years, with the six ward seats up together, followed two years later by the three at-large seats and the mayoral seat. Under the City of Rahway's form of government, all executive and administrative authority is vested in the office of the mayor, who appoints the Business Administrator and department directors. The Business Administrator develops an annual budget for the city, manages the city's departments and oversees its employees. This form of government gives citizens a centralized line of authority for the efficient management of the city's business.

As of 2026, the mayor of Rahway is Democrat Raymond A. Giacobbe Jr., whose term of office ends December 31, 2026. The members of the City Council are Jeffrey Brooks (At Large; D, 2026), David Brown (Fourth Ward; D, 2028), Darlene Eastman (Second Ward; D, 2028), Joseph D. Gibilisco (Sixth Ward; D, 2028), Joanna Miles (At Large; D, 2026), Jeremy E. Mojica (At Large; D, 2026), Al Montesdeoca (First Ward; D, 2028), Danielle "Danni" Newbury (Fifth Ward; D, 2028), and Karla Timmons (Third Ward; D, appointed to an unexpired term ending 2028).

In May 2026, Karla Timmons was appointed to fill the third ward seating expiring in December 2028 that had been held by Vannie Deloris Parson until she resigned from office the previous month. Timmons, who had earlier served on the city council representing the second ward, will serve on an interim basis until the November 2026 general election, when voters will select a candidate to serve the balance of the term of office.

=== Federal, state, and county representation ===
Rahway is located in the 7th Congressional District and is part of New Jersey's 22nd state legislative district.

For the 119th United States Congress, New Jersey's 7th congressional district is represented by Thomas Kean Jr. (R, Westfield). New Jersey is represented in the United States Senate by Democrats Cory Booker (Newark, term ends 2027) and Andy Kim (Moorestown, term ends 2031).

For the 2026–2027 session, the 22nd legislative district of the New Jersey Legislature is represented in the State Senate by Nicholas Scutari (D, Linden) and in the General Assembly by Linda S. Carter (D, Plainfield) and James J. Kennedy (D, Rahway).

Union County is governed by a Board of County Commissioners, whose nine members are elected at-large to three-year terms of office on a staggered basis with three seats coming up for election each year, with an appointed County Manager overseeing the day-to-day operations of the county. At an annual reorganization meeting held in the beginning of January, the board selects a Chair and Vice Chair from among its members. As of 2026, Union County's County Commissioners are:

Vice Chair Rebecca Williams (D, Plainfield, 2028), Chairman Joesph Bodek (D, Linden, 2026), James E. Baker Jr. (D, Rahway, 2027), Michele Delisfort (D, Union Township, 2026), Lourdes M. Leon (D, Elizabeth, 2026), Alexander Mirabella (D, Fanwood, 2027) Kimberly Palmieri-Mouded (D, Westfield, 2027). Stanley J. Neron (D, Elizabeth, 2028), Joseph Signorello III (D, Roselle Park, 2028)

Constitutional officers elected on a countywide basis are: Clerk Vacant - Incumbent Clerk Joanne Rajoppi (D, Union Township) died on July 16, 2026. Her death triggered a special election for a full five-year term to be held concurrently with the November 2026 general election. Deputy Clerk Clara Fernández assumes the powers of the office until the vacancy is filled. Sheriff Peter Corvelli (D, Kenilworth, 2026) and Surrogate Christopher E. Hudak (D, Clark, 2027).

=== Politics ===
As of March 2011, there were a total of 15,719 registered voters in Rahway, of whom 7,159 (45.5% vs. 41.8% countywide) were registered as Democrats, 1,675 (10.7% vs. 15.3%) were registered as Republicans and 6,880 (43.8% vs. 42.9%) were registered as Unaffiliated. There were 5 voters registered as Libertarians or Greens. Among the city's 2010 Census population, 57.5% (vs. 53.3% in Union County) were registered to vote, including 73.5% of those ages 18 and over (vs. 70.6% countywide).

Gubernatorial election results for Rahway
Year	Republican		Democratic		Third party(ies)	
Year	No.	%	No.	%	No.	%
2025	2,386	23.71%	7,599	75.51%	79	0.78%
2021	2,139	31.15%	4,640	67.58%	87	1.27%
2017	1,648	26.17%	4,489	71.29%	160	2.54%
2013	2,494	43.01%	3,211	55.38%	93	1.60%
2009	2,451	35.80%	3,961	57.86%	434	6.34%
2005	2,159	32.57%	4,225	63.74%	244	3.68%

In the 2012 presidential election, Democrat Barack Obama received 8,413 votes (74.7% vs. 66.0% countywide), ahead of Republican Mitt Romney with 2,648 votes (23.5% vs. 32.3%) and other candidates with 107 votes (0.9% vs. 0.8%), among the 11,269 ballots cast by the city's 16,730 registered voters, for a turnout of 67.4% (vs. 68.8% in Union County). In the 2008 presidential election, Democrat Barack Obama received 8,340 votes (69.8% vs. 63.1% countywide), ahead of Republican John McCain with 3,410 votes (28.5% vs. 35.2%) and other candidates with 115 votes (1.0% vs. 0.9%), among the 11,944 ballots cast by the city's 16,039 registered voters, for a turnout of 74.5% (vs. 74.7% in Union County). In the 2004 presidential election, Democrat John Kerry received 6,512 votes (63.1% vs. 58.3% countywide), ahead of Republican George W. Bush with 3,668 votes (35.5% vs. 40.3%) and other candidates with 92 votes (0.9% vs. 0.7%), among the 10,326 ballots cast by the city's 14,471 registered voters, for a turnout of 71.4% (vs. 72.3% in the whole county).

United States presidential election results for Rahway
Year	Republican		Democratic		Third party(ies)	
Year	No.	%	No.	%	No.	%
2024	4,089	30.61%	9,016	67.50%	252	1.89%
2020	3,644	26.23%	10,077	72.53%	172	1.24%
2016	3,151	26.76%	8,318	70.64%	306	2.60%
2012	2,648	23.71%	8,413	75.33%	107	0.96%
2008	3,410	28.74%	8,340	70.29%	115	0.97%
2004	3,668	35.71%	6,512	63.40%	92	0.90%

In the 2017 gubernatorial election, Democrat Phil Murphy received 4,489 votes (71.3% vs. 65.2% countywide), ahead of Republican Kim Guadagno with 1,648 votes (26.2% vs. 32.6%), and other candidates with 160 votes (2.5% vs. 2.1%), among the 6,414 ballots cast by the city's 17,613 registered voters, for a turnout of 36.4%. In the 2013 gubernatorial election, Democrat Barbara Buono received 55.4% of the vote (3,211 cast), ahead of Republican Chris Christie with 43.0% (2,494 votes), and other candidates with 1.6% (93 votes), among the 5,934 ballots cast by the city's 16,359 registered voters (136 ballots were spoiled), for a turnout of 36.3%. In the 2009 gubernatorial election, Democrat Jon Corzine received 3,961 ballots cast (57.4% vs. 50.6% countywide), ahead of Republican Chris Christie with 2,451 votes (35.5% vs. 41.7%), Independent Chris Daggett with 366 votes (5.3% vs. 5.9%) and other candidates with 68 votes (1.0% vs. 0.8%), among the 6,895 ballots cast by the city's 15,842 registered voters, yielding a 43.5% turnout (vs. 46.5% in the county).

United States Senate election results for Rahway1
Year	Republican		Democratic		Third party(ies)	
Year	No.	%	No.	%	No.	%
2024	3,428	27.09%	8,603	68.00%	621	4.91%
2018	2,232	24.70%	6,316	69.89%	489	5.41%
2012	2,347	23.78%	7,351	74.48%	172	1.74%
2006	2,317	34.99%	4,132	62.40%	173	2.61%

United States Senate election results for Rahway2
Year	Republican		Democratic		Third party(ies)	
Year	No.	%	No.	%	No.	%
2020	3,248	23.85%	10,062	73.88%	310	2.28%
2014	1,512	26.15%	4,162	71.97%	109	1.88%
2013	1,160	28.23%	2,905	70.70%	44	1.07%
2008	2,881	29.09%	6,809	68.74%	215	2.17%

== Education ==
The Rahway Public Schools serve students in pre-kindergarten through twelfth grade. As of the 2024–25 school year, the district, comprised of six schools, had an enrollment of 4,311 students and 327.1 classroom teachers (on an FTE basis), for a student–teacher ratio of 13.2:1. Schools in the district (with 2024–25 enrollment data from the National Center for Education Statistics) are Grover Cleveland Elementary School with 453 students in grades PreK–6, Franklin Elementary School with 658 students in grades PreK–6, Madison Elementary School with 384 students in grades PreK–6, Roosevelt Elementary School with 608 students in grades PreK–6, Rahway 7th & 8th Grade Academy with 701 students in grades 7–8 and Rahway High School with 1,286 students in grades 9–12.

== Trivia ==
=== Marquis de Lafayette ===
From July 1824 to September 1825, the French Marquis de Lafayette, the last surviving major general of the American Revolutionary War, made a tour of the 24 states in the United States, stopping at the Peace Tavern in Rahway.

=== Nikola Tesla ===
In the 1880s, Nikola Tesla opened Tesla Electric Light & Manufacturing in Rahway.

=== Legends of pirate treasure ===
According to recently resurfaced 19th century lore, Captain William Kidd buried treasure in the Rahway area, alongside the body of one of his men he had just murdered.

The location of this pirate treasure was said to be on the southern banks of the Rahway River at a spot called Price's or Post's Woods, said to be midway between Rahway and the Arthur Kill.

The murder and burial of treasure was witnessed secretly from a tree, allegedly, by a Lenape chieftain known as Ra-wa-rah who is the namesake of the city of Rahway. Ra-wa-rah allegedly witnessed the murder and burial of treasure while returning from a fishing journey.

=== East Jersey State Prison ===
East Jersey State Prison, formerly known as Rahway State Prison, actually is located in Woodbridge Township at the border with Rahway. The prison's mailing address is in Rahway, leading many to believe the facility was located there. The prison's official name was changed to East Jersey State Prison as of November 30, 1988, at the request of the residents of Rahway. East Jersey State Prison is seen at the beginning of the movie Ocean's Eleven, starring George Clooney. The 1978 documentary Scared Straight was filmed there, as was the 1989 movie Lock Up, starring Sylvester Stallone. The prison was briefly mentioned in John Sayles City of Hope (1991).

=== The Unknown Woman ===
The Rahway murder of 1887 was the unsolved murder of an unidentified young woman whose body was found in the city on March 25, 1887, garnering attention from the press and the public.

== Transportation ==
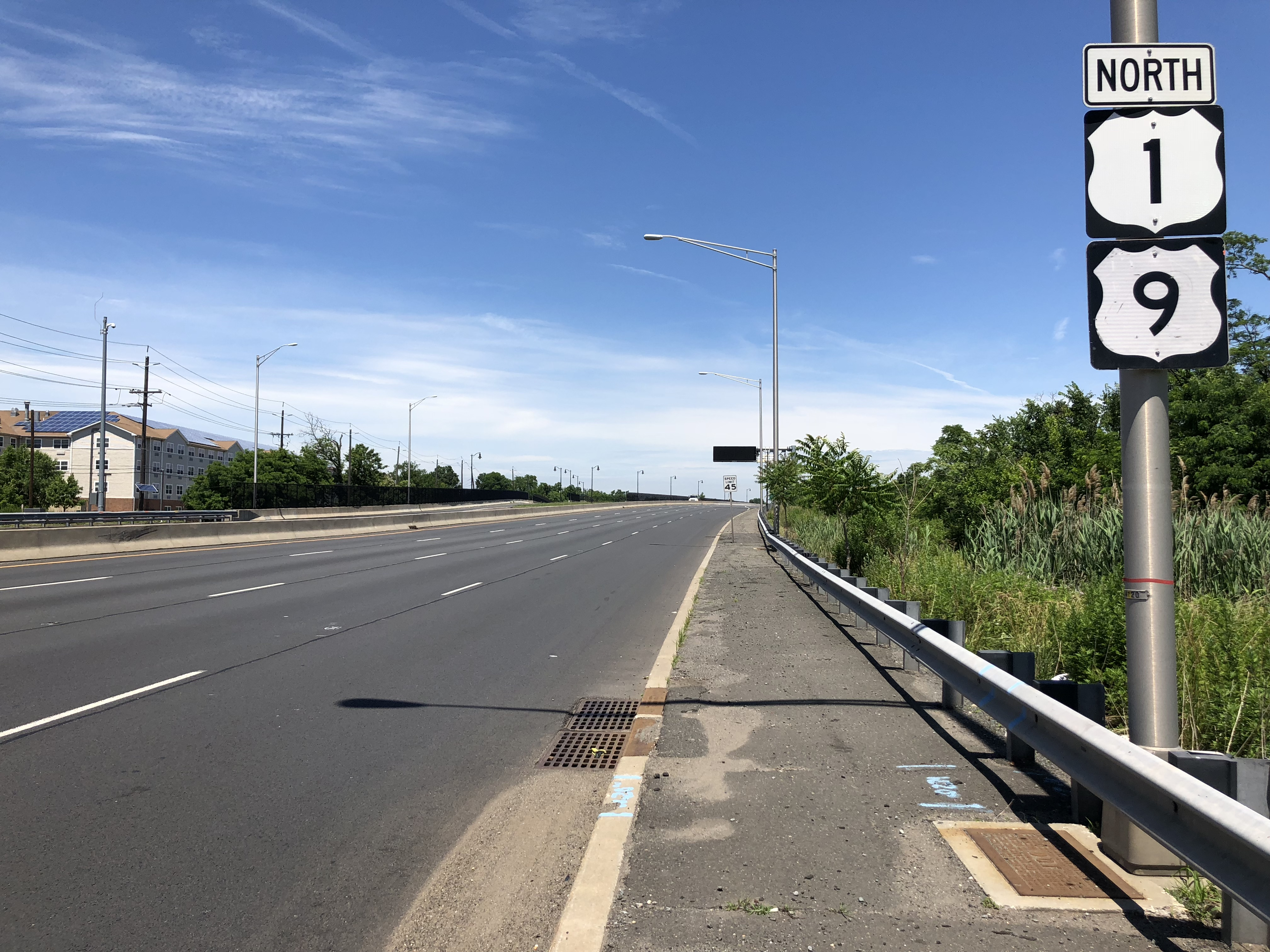
U.S. Route 1/9 northbound in Rahway

=== Roads and highways ===
As of 2010, the city had a total of 73.67 miles (118.56 km) of roadways, of which 59.18 miles (95.24 km) were maintained by the municipality, 10.45 miles (16.82 km) by Union County and 4.04 miles (6.50 km) by the New Jersey Department of Transportation.

Rahway is served by U.S. Route 1/9, Route 27, and Route 35. The city is sandwiched between the Garden State Parkway and the New Jersey Turnpike, which are each located about two miles outside of the city limits.

There are several crossings of the Rahway River in the city.

=== Public transportation ===
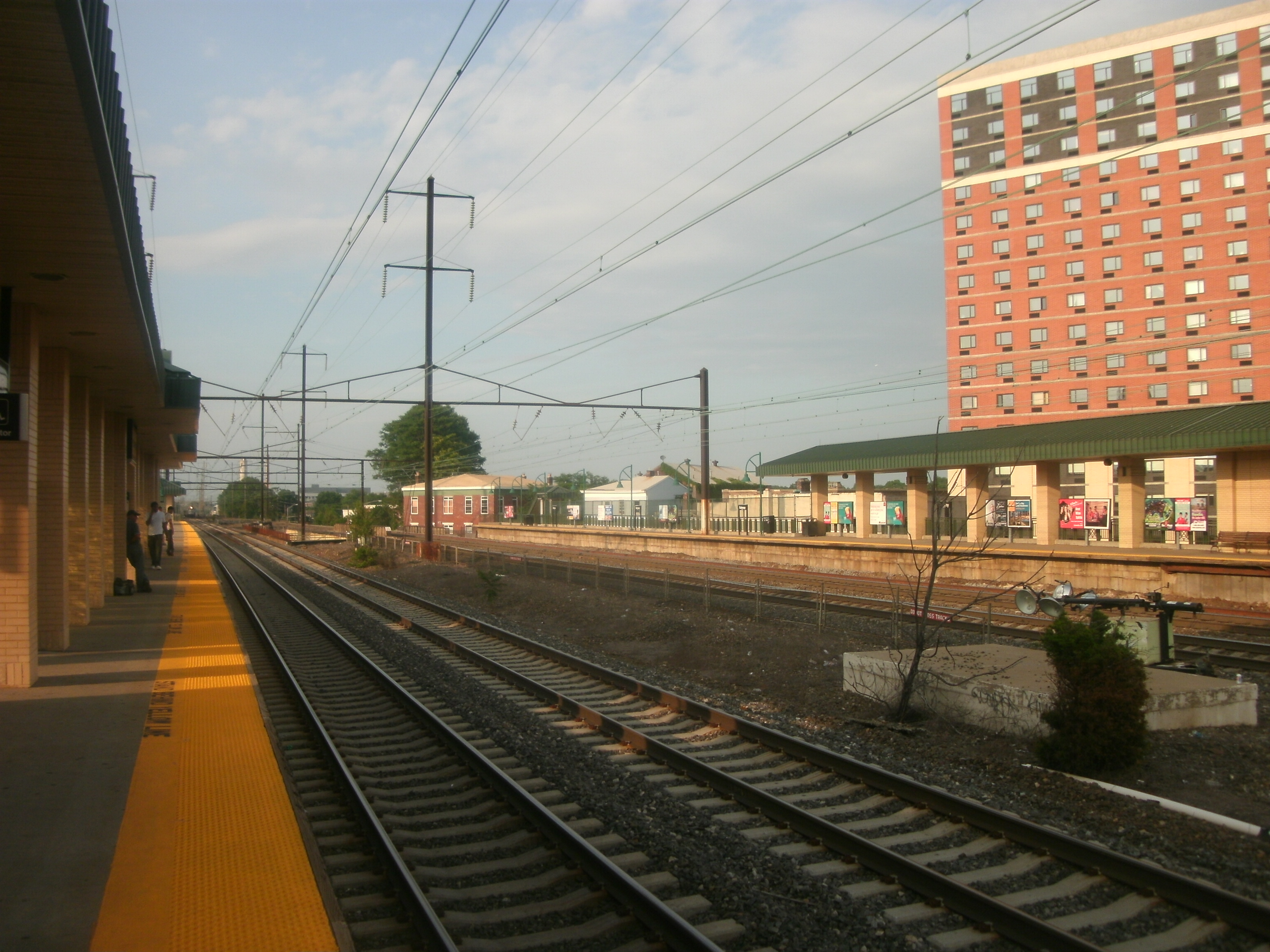
The Rahway Station of NJ Transit

NJ Transit 115 route provides local service and interstate service to and from the Port Authority Bus Terminal in Midtown Manhattan, with service on the 48 line to Elizabeth and Perth Amboy.

NJ Transit provides commuter rail service at the Rahway station. Trains are provided on the North Jersey Coast Line and Northeast Corridor Line, with a typical train ride from Rahway to New York Penn Station in Midtown Manhattan taking 38 minutes. The City of Rahway and NJ Transit helped fund a $16 million renovation for the station in 1999 and a public plaza in front of the station was completed in 2001, changes that have spurred cleanup and revitalization downtown. A new $11.2 million 524-space parking deck opened across the street from the station in January 2005, helping train commuters and allowing the city to transform old parking lot space into new buildings and residences.

=== Airport ===
Newark Liberty International Airport is 10.2 miles (16.4 km) northeast of Rahway, approximately a 20-minute drive by car, or approximately 16 minutes by the North Jersey Coast or Northeast Corridor lines.

== Climate ==
The climate in this area is characterized by hot, humid summers and generally mild to cool winters. According to the Köppen Climate Classification system, Rahway has a humid subtropical climate, abbreviated "Cfa" on climate maps.

Climate data for Rahway, New Jersey
Month	Jan	Feb	Mar	Apr	May	Jun	Jul	Aug	Sep	Oct	Nov	Dec	Year
Mean daily maximum °C (°F)	4 (39)	6 (42)	11 (51)	17 (62)	22 (71)	27 (81)	30 (86)	29 (84)	24 (76)	18 (65)	12 (54)	6 (43)	18 (65)
Mean daily minimum °C (°F)	−4 (24)	−3 (26)	1 (33)	6 (42)	11 (52)	16 (61)	19 (66)	18 (64)	14 (57)	7 (45)	3 (38)	−2 (29)	7 (44)
Average precipitation mm (inches)	74 (2.9)	71 (2.8)	97 (3.8)	97 (3.8)	97 (3.8)	86 (3.4)	120 (4.8)	110 (4.2)	94 (3.7)	76 (3)	94 (3.7)	89 (3.5)	1,100 (43.4)
Source: Weatherbase

== Notable people ==
People who were born in, residents of, or otherwise closely associated with Rahway include:

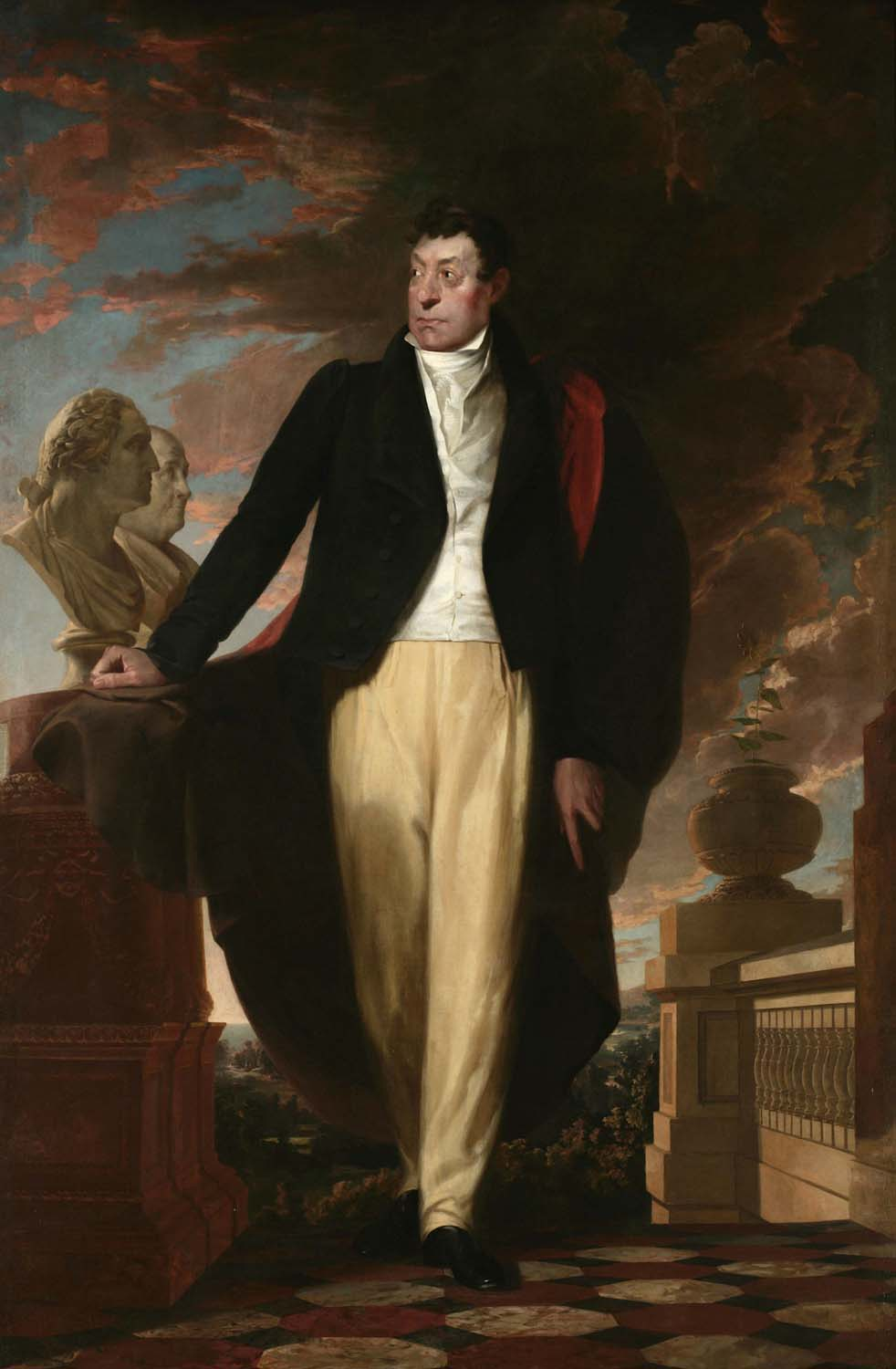
Marquis de Lafayette

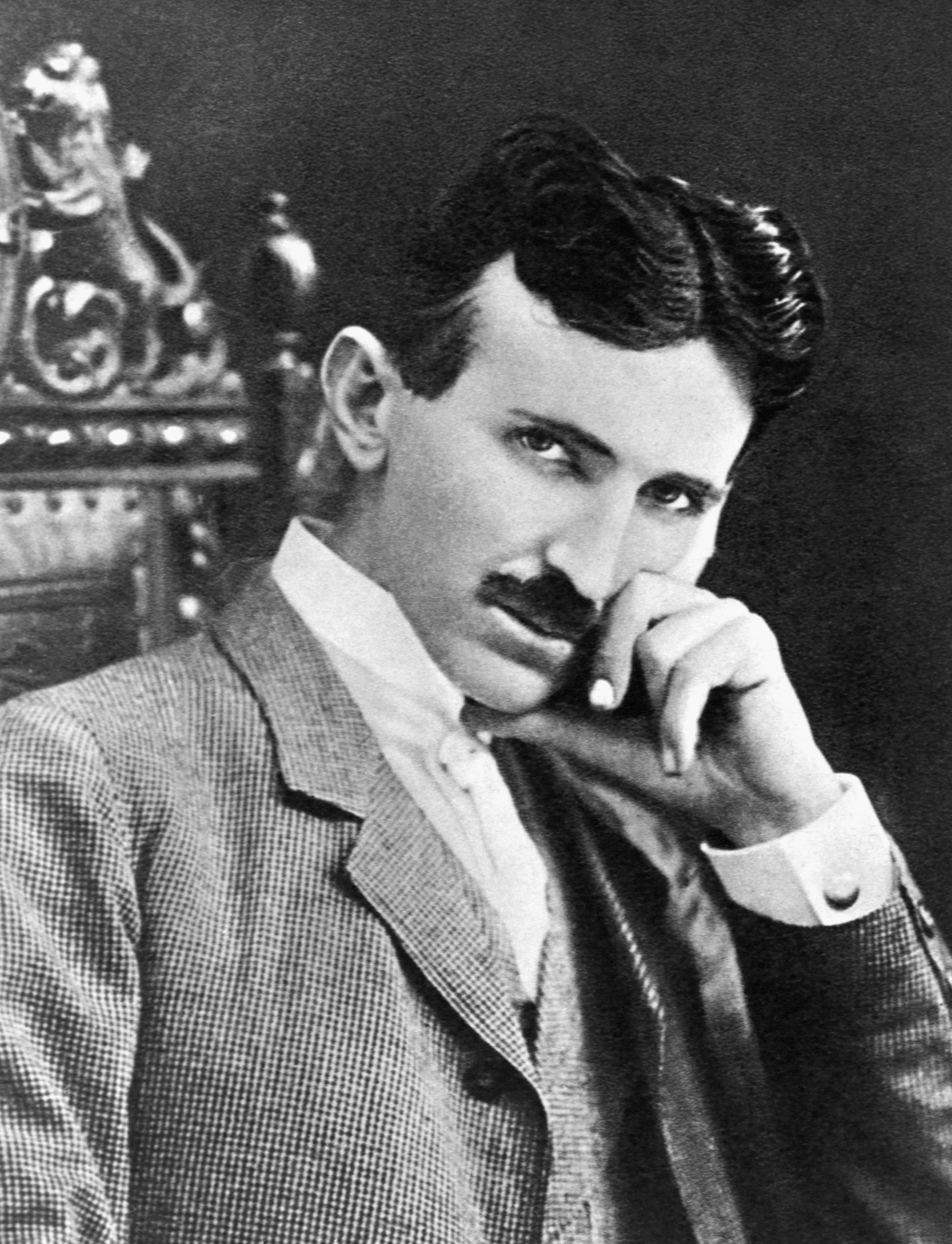
Nikola Tesla

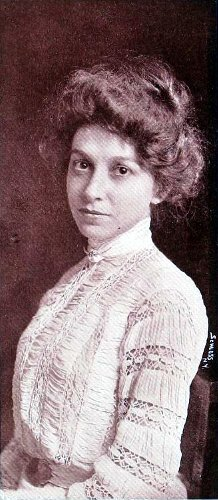
Juliette Atkinson

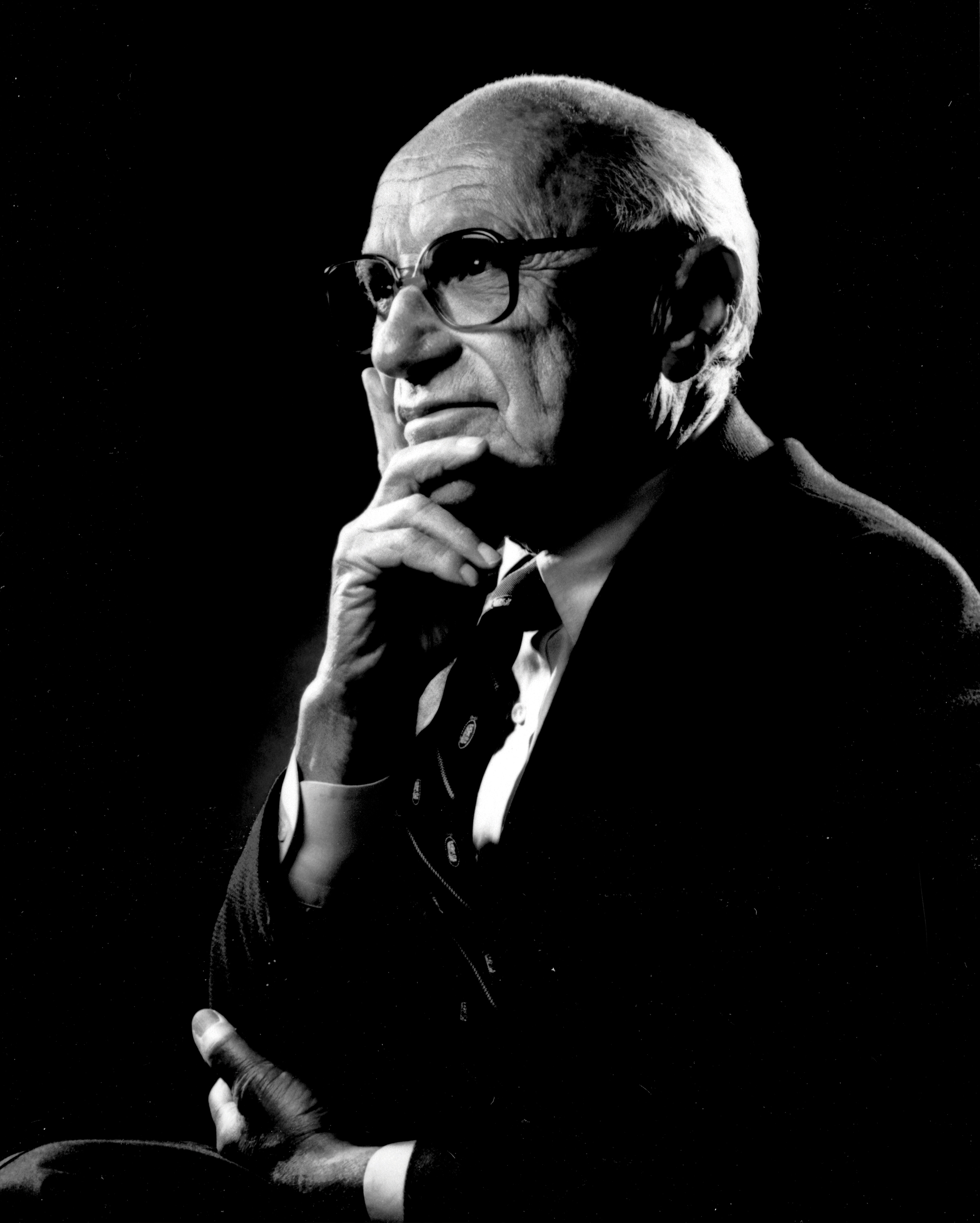
Milton Friedman

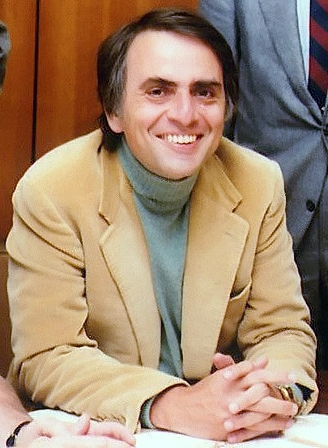
Carl Sagan

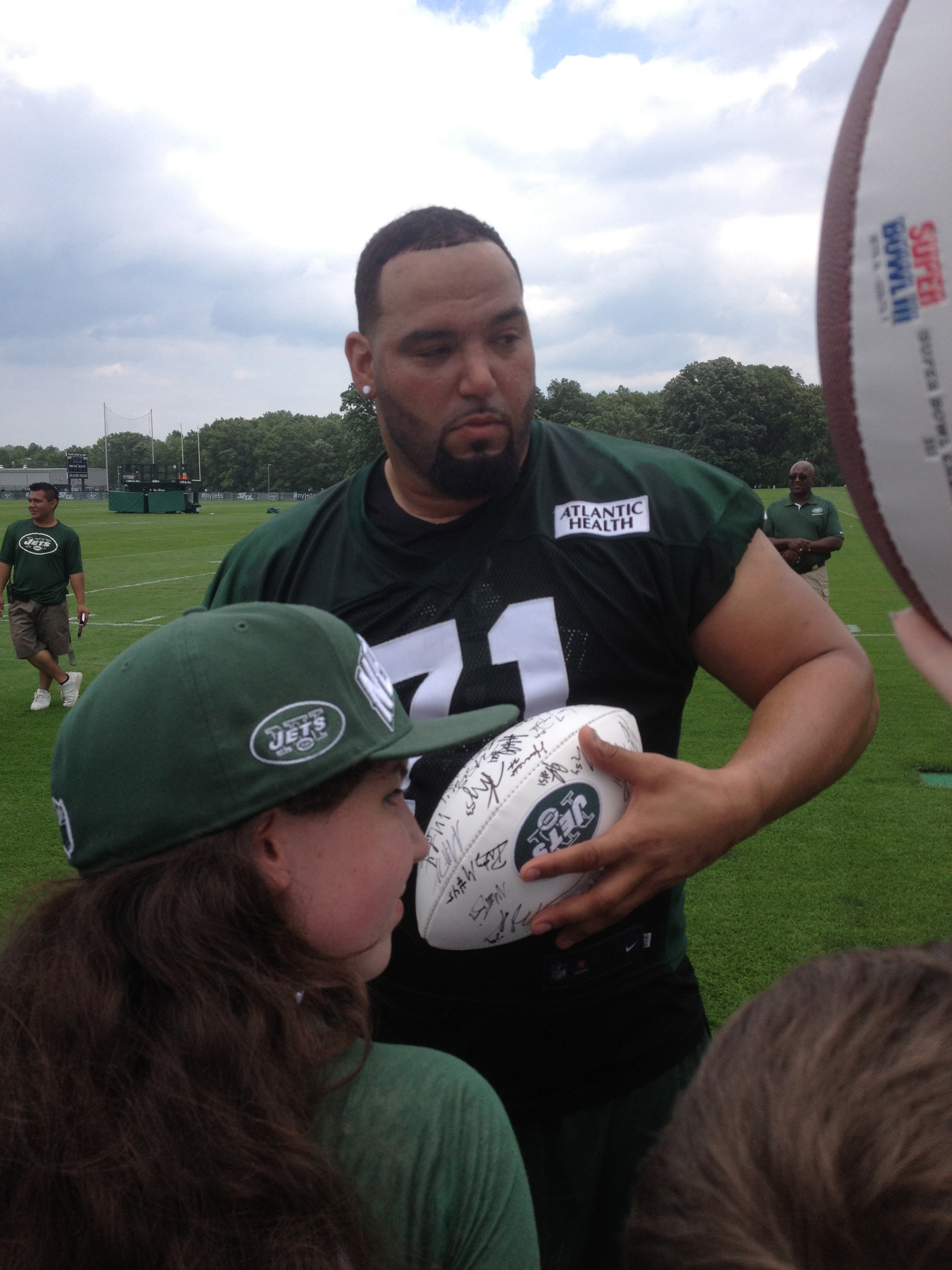
Antonio Garay

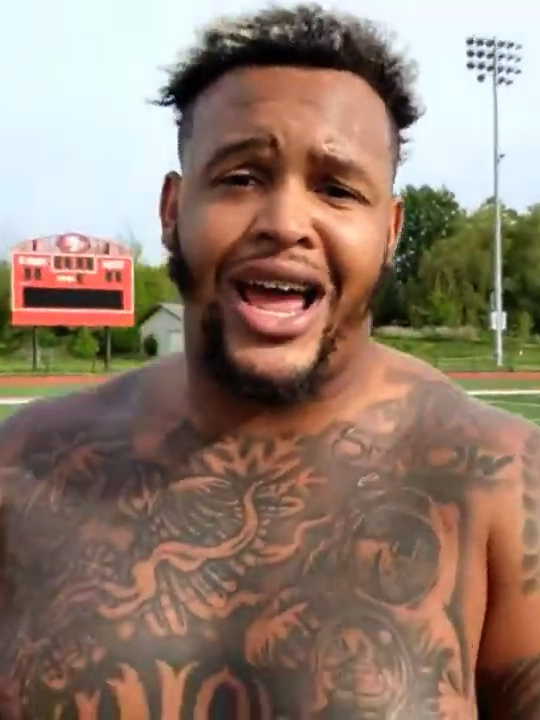
Dion Dawkins

- Antonio Alfano (born 2000), American football defensive tackle for the Colorado Buffaloes
- Juliette Atkinson (1873–1944), Hall of Fame tennis player and three-time U.S. Open champion
- Robert Lee Bloomfield (1827–1916), businessman and church-founder
- Peter Boettke (born 1960), economist of the Austrian School
- Frank E. Boland (c. 1880–1913), James Paul Boland (1882–1970) and Joseph John Boland (1879–1964), early aircraft designers who started the Boland Airplane and Motor Company
- Aaron Bradshaw (born 2003), basketball player
- Kimberly Brandão (born 1984), professional women's soccer player; captain of the Portugal Women's National Team, which she has represented since 2007
- Chris Brantley (born 1970), former NFL wide receiver; played for the Los Angeles Rams and Buffalo Bills
- Ronald Breslow (1931-2017), chemist
- Isaac Brokaw (1746–1826), clockmaker
- Harvey Brown (1795–1874), military officer who fought in the Black Hawk and Seminole Wars, the Mexican–American War and the American Civil War
- James Monroe Buckley (1836–1920), Methodist minister, doctor, author and editor of the Christian Advocate
- Darrion Caldwell (born 1987), mixed martial artist and former Bellator Bantamweight World Champion, NCAA wrestling national champion at NC State
- Louis Campbell (born 1979), professional basketball player; plays for Strasbourg IG of the French League
- Clifford P. Case (1904–1982), Representative of the Sixth District of New Jersey in the House of Representatives (1945–1954); United States Senator (R-NJ) 1955–1979
- Abraham Clark (1725–1794), signer of the Declaration of Independence; buried at the Rahway Cemetery
- Earl Clark (born 1988), professional basketball player who played in the NBA for the Brooklyn Nets
- Samuel Hanson Cox (1793–1880), Presbyterian minister and abolitionist
- Mary Frances Creighton (1899–1936), housewife, who along with Everett Applegate, was executed in Sing Sing prison's electric chair, Old Sparky, for the poisoning of Applegate's wife
- Joseph T. Crowell (1817–1891), Speaker of the New Jersey General Assembly and President of the New Jersey Senate
- Arnold D'Ambrosa (1933-2018), politician who served in the New Jersey General Assembly from 1974 to 1976, until his career was cut short by a political scandal
- George Davenport (1783–1845), frontiersman, trader, United States Army officer and settler in the Iowa Territory; namesake of Davenport, Iowa
- Dion Dawkins (born 1994), offensive tackle for the Buffalo Bills of the NFL
- Evie (born 1956), contemporary Christian music singer
- John Frazee (1790–1862), sculptor and architect
- Amos Noë Freeman (1809–1893), abolitionist, educator and Presbyterian minister
- Milton Friedman (1912–2006), economist and Nobel Prize winner
- Leighton Gage (1942–2013), author of crime fiction
- Antonio Garay (born 1979), defensive tackle for the San Diego Chargers
- Wayne Gilchrest (born 1946), U.S. Congressman
- Alfred M. Gray Jr. (1928–2024), 29th Commandant of the Marine Corps, from July 1, 1987, to June 30, 1991
- Jerome Kagan (1929–2021), professor emeritus of psychology at Harvard University; one of the pioneers of developmental psychology
- Janis Karpinski (born 1953), one of the first women Brigadier Generals of the Army; former commander of the Abu Ghraib Prison in Iraq
- William H. Lash (1961–2006), Assistant Secretary of Commerce for Market Access and Compliance 2001–2005
- Paul Matey (born 1971), attorney who is a United States circuit judge of the United States Court of Appeals for the Third Circuit
- Benjamin Fay Mills (1857–1916), evangelist preacher, vegetarianism activist and writer
- Richard Moran (born 1950), investor, venture capitalist, author and president emeritus of Menlo College
- Ira Nadel (born 1943), biographer, literary critic and James Joyce scholar
- Olsen Pierre (born 1991), American football defensive end who played in the NFL for the Arizona Cardinals
- Dory Previn (1925–2012, born as Dorothy Veronica Langan), lyricist and singer-songwriter
- Pearl Reaves (1929–2000), R&B singer and guitarist
- Eric Roberson (born 1976), R&B and soul singer-songwriter
- Freddie Russo (1924–1987), professional boxer
- Carl Sagan (1934–1996), astronomer; winner of Pulitzer Prize for General Nonfiction Writing in 1978
- Mike Seamon (born 1988), soccer midfielder who has played for the Seattle Sounders FC and the Pittsburgh Riverhounds
- Mark Slonaker (born 1957), college basketball coach; head coach of the Mercer Bears men's basketball team 1998–2008
- Chris Smith (born 1953), U.S. Congressman
- Dexter Strickland (born 1990), McDonald's High School All-American basketball player; attended the University of North Carolina at Chapel Hill
- Kurt Sutter (born 1966), screenwriter, director, producer and actor
- Nikola Tesla (1856–1943), formed his company, Tesla Electric Light & Manufacturing, in Rahway
- Marques Townes (born 1995), basketball player who played for the Loyola Ramblers men's basketball team
- Kevin M. Tucker (1940–2012), Commissioner of the Philadelphia Police Department from 1986 to 1988
- Allan Vache (born 1953), jazz clarinetist; younger brother of Vaché Jr.
- Warren Vaché Jr. (born 1951), jazz cornetist and veteran of the groups of Benny Goodman, Rosemary Clooney, Benny Carter, Annie Ross and many other jazz notables
- Warren Vaché Sr. (1914–2005), jazz musician and journalist
- P. Roy Vagelos (born 1929), retired Merck & Co. CEO
- Carolyn Wells (1862–1942), author and poet
- Joe Williams (1941–2015), football player for the Winnipeg Blue Bombers, Ottawa Rough Riders and Toronto Argonauts in the Canadian Football League
- Shanice Williams (born 1996), actress who starred as Dorothy in The Wiz Live! on NBC in December 2015
- Emmanuel Yarbrough (1964–2015), 1995 USA World Sumo Champion
- Robert Rahway Zakanitch (born 1935), painter and a founder of the Pattern and Decoration movement
