= P. Roy Vagelos =

American physician and business executive

Roy Vagelos
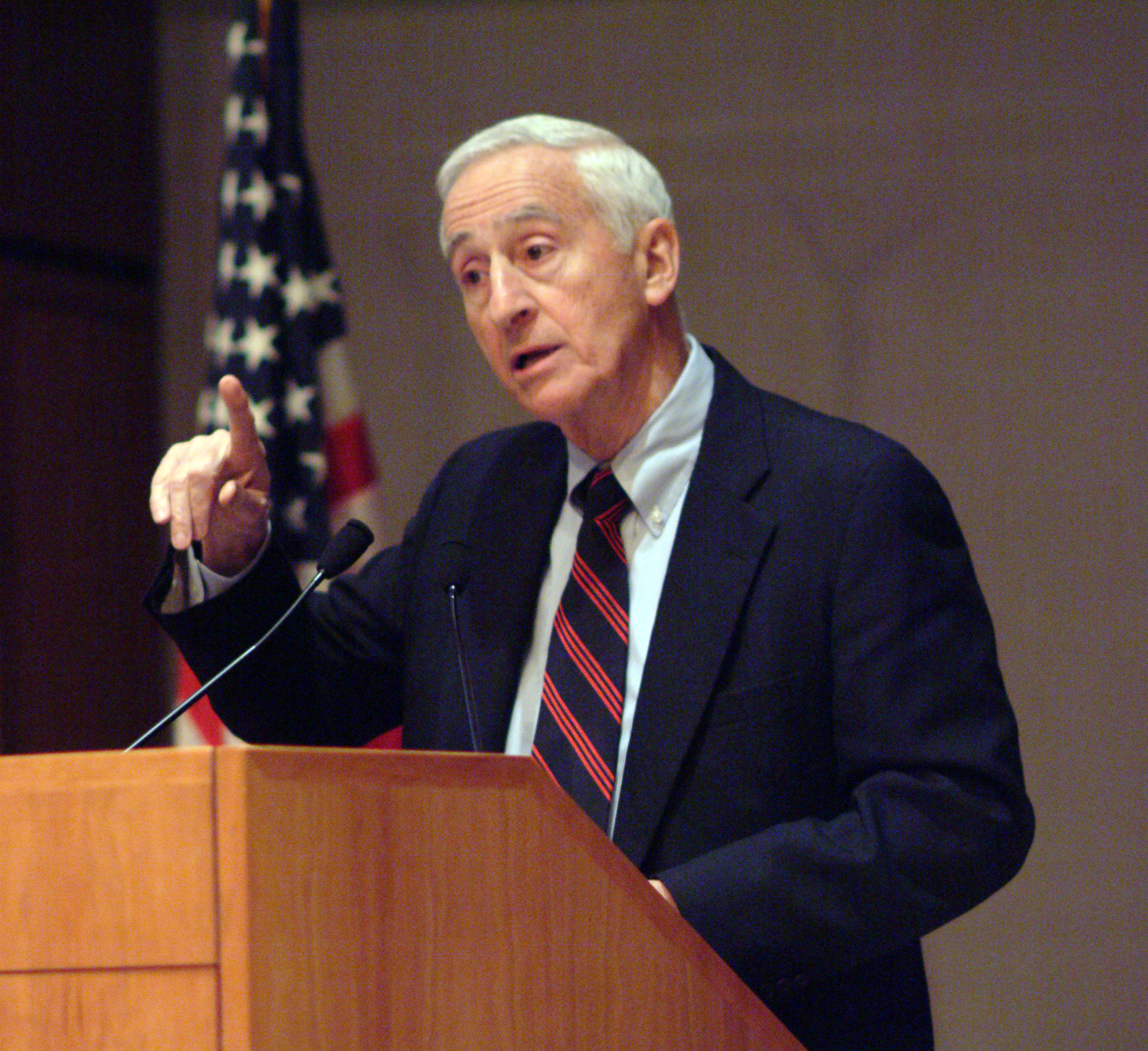
- Vagelos in 2005
- Born: Pindaros Roy Vagelos; October 8, 1929 (age 97); Westfield, New Jersey, United States
- Education: University of Pennsylvania (BA) Columbia College of Physicians and Surgeons (MD)
- Spouse: Diana
- Awards: Pfizer Award in Enzyme Chemistry (1967); Maxwell Finland Award (1991); Prince Mahidol Award (1997)
- Scientific career
- Fields: Biochemistry, Medicine, Pharmaceutical industry

Pindaros Roy Vagelos (born October 8, 1929) is an American physician and business executive, who was president and chief executive officer (1985) and chairman (1986) of the American pharmaceutical company Merck & Co. (known as MSD outside the U.S.).

Since 1995, Vagelos has served as chairman of the board of Regeneron Pharmaceuticals.

He was founding chair of the Prix Galien USA awards committee (from 2007 to 2017) and was the first recipient of the Galien Foundation's Pro Bono Humanum Award, which in 2018 was renamed in his honor to the Roy Vagelos Pro Bono Humanum Award for Global Health Equity.

In addition to his business accomplishments, Vagelos is the author of more than 100 scientific papers. He is also on the board of trustees of the University of Pennsylvania and has funded three of the university's elite undergraduate programs: The Vagelos Scholars Program in Molecular Life Sciences (MLS), The Vagelos Program in Life Sciences and Management (LSM) and The Vagelos Integrated Program in Energy Research (VIPER).

== Biography ==
Vagelos grew up during the Great Depression as a son of Greek immigrants. He attended Rahway High School in his hometown of Rahway, New Jersey. After winning a partial scholarship, he left his family's small restaurant in Rahway, to become a doctor. He majored in chemistry at the University of Pennsylvania, graduating Phi Beta Kappa in 1950. Vagelos later earned an MD from Columbia University in 1954.

Vagelos deferred military service while in medical school, but he was obligated to serve a two-year stint as an Army doctor. As a Columbia University College of Physicians and Surgeons trained physician, Vagelos obtained a two-year assignment as a scientist at the National Institutes of Health (1956–1966). For Vagelos, it was a fateful turning point. He was associated with Massachusetts General Hospital, Washington University in St. Louis and the Washington University School of Medicine (1966–1975) before joining Merck, Sharp & Dohme Research Laboratories in Rahway. He was promoted to CEO (in 1985) and Chairman (1986), succeeding John Horan. He retired from Merck in 1994.

Vagelos has been elected to the American Academy of Arts and Sciences, the National Academy of Sciences and the American Philosophical Society.

In 1995, Vagelos received the NAS Award for Chemistry in Service to Society and was inducted into the Junior Achievement U.S. Business Hall of Fame. In 1999, he became a recipient of both the Bower Award for Business Leadership, as well as the Othmer Gold Medal.

In 2013, Vagelos was invited to speak at the first annual Stony Brook University Research Your Future Symposium.

Vagelos was awarded an honorary Doctor of Humane Letters from Dartmouth College in 2024.

== River blindness ==
In the mid-1980s, Merck & Co. discovered the drug ivermectin, capable of combatting the parasite that causes river blindness. At the time, the World Health Organization and the World Bank were conducting a campaign against the vector-borne disease in West Africa, and ivermectin was the most important drug in their arsenal. But the newly discovered drug was too expensive for those patients or their governments. Vagelos "wanted to see the drug widely used," so he influenced Merck & Co. to "make needed quantities of the drug available to these governments and patients, at no cost to them, for the treatment of onchocerciasis.” Over two decades, beginning in 1986, the drug reached more than 55 million people. The public health campaign was successful, and now river blindness is no longer a major public health issue in the savannah areas of West Africa.

== Philanthropy ==
Together, Roy Vagelos and his wife Diana Vagelos donated over $98.5 million to the University of Pennsylvania to create the Roy and Diana Vagelos Laboratories. These funds also made possible the founding the Vagelos Scholars Program in Molecular Life Sciences, an intensive program offered to University of Pennsylvania freshmen. In addition, they donated funds to launch the Vagelos Program in Life Sciences and Management, a joint program between the Wharton School at the University of Pennsylvania and its College of Arts and Sciences. Later, they founded the Vagelos Integrated Program in Energy Research, supporting the necessity of energy research. Altogether Vagelos and his wife have donated $239 million to the University of Pennsylvania.

In 2010, Vagelos, who had earned his medical degree at Columbia University, and Diana, an alumna of Barnard College at Columbia University, donated $50 million to the Columbia College of Physicians and Surgeons, towards the construction of a new building named the Roy and Diana Vagelos Education Center; it opened in August 2016.

In 2017, it was announced at the Crown Awards that the College of Physicians and Surgeons would be renamed the Columbia University Roy and Diana Vagelos College of Physicians and Surgeons in recognition of a $250 million gift given by Vagelos to the college. A substantial part of the donation ($150 million) would be used to endow a fund that will help eliminate student loans for medical students who qualify for financial aid. Altogether, the Vageloses have been responsible for about $450 million in philanthropy to Columbia's medical school.

In 2022, the Vageloses donated $55 million to Barnard College to support the college's STEM education efforts. It is the largest donation in the college's 130-year history.

In March 2023, the Vageloses donated $175 million to Columbia to establish the Vagelos Institute for Biomedical Research Education.

In August 2024, the Vageloses donated an additional $400 million to Columbia to further "biomedical science research and education and produce a vast array of compelling opportunities for improving society’s health and wellbeing."

He served on the Board of Trustees at the New Jersey Performing Arts Center and is currently listed as a Director Emeriti there.
