= Rahway Township, New Jersey =

Human settlement in United States of America

Coordinates: 40.615°N 74.279°W

Historical population
Census	Pop.	Note	%±
1810	1,779		—
1820	1,945		9.3%
1830	1,983		2.0%
1840	2,533		27.7%
1850	3,306		30.5%
Population sources: 1810-1850 1840 1850

Rahway Township was a township in New Jersey, United States, that existed from 1804 until it was dissolved in 1861.

Rahway was formed as a township by an Act of the New Jersey Legislature on February 27, 1804, from portions of Elizabeth Township and Westfield Township while the area was still part of Essex County, New Jersey. On March 19, 1857, it became part of the newly created Union County. The City of Rahway was incorporated on 19 of April, 1858, from portions of Rahway Township in Union and Woodbridge Township in Middlesex County. Portions of the township, along with territory from Elizabeth and Union Township, were taken on March 4, 1861, to form Linden Township. The township was dissolved on March 13, 1861, when the remaining portions of the township were annexed by the City of Rahway.
