= David Brearley High School =

High school in Union County, New Jersey, US

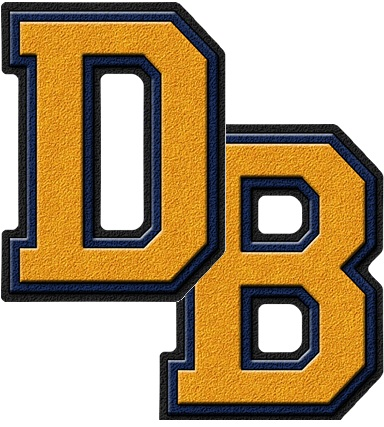

Location
- 401 Monroe Avenue; Kenilworth, Union County, New Jersey 07033; United States; 40.679461°N 74.297333°W

Information
- Type: Public high school
- Established: 1966 (as David Brearley Regional High School); 1997 (as David Brearley Middle-High School)
- School district: Kenilworth Public Schools
- NCES School ID: 340792000209
- Principal: Vincent Cuccaro
- Faculty: 69.8 FTEs
- Grades: 9–12
- Enrollment: 774 (as of 2024–25)
- Student to teacher ratio: 11.1:1
- Colors: Navy blue and Gold
- Athletics conference: Union County Interscholastic Athletic Conference (general); Big Central Football Conference (football)
- Team name: Bears
- Newspaper: The Bear Print
- Website: www.kenilworthschools.com/schools/david_brearly_high_school

David Brearley High School is a four-year comprehensive public high school that serves students in ninth through twelfth grades from Kenilworth in Union County, in the U.S. state of New Jersey, operating as the lone secondary school of the Kenilworth Public Schools. The school is named for David Brearley, a signer of the United States Constitution.

Students from Winfield Township attend the school as part of a sending/receiving relationship with the Winfield Township School District.

As of the 2024–25 school year, the school had an enrollment of 774 students and 69.8 classroom teachers (on an FTE basis), for a student–teacher ratio of 11.1:1. There were 200 students (25.8% of enrollment) eligible for free lunch and 57 (7.4% of students) eligible for reduced-cost lunch.

The district participates in the Interdistrict Public School Choice Program at David Brearley High School, having been approved on November 2, 1999, as one of the first ten districts statewide to participate in the program. Available slots are announced annually by grade. Prospective Choice participants must be residents of Union County eligible for placement in grades 7-10 who were enrolled in a public school during the full year prior to entry to the Kenilworth Public Schools.

== History ==
Planning for a fourth Regional District high school to be located in Kenilworth began in April 1957, when voters approved the purchase of a 15-acre site as part of an expansion referendum that also included the construction of Governor Livingston Regional High School and an addition at Arthur L. Johnson Regional High School. Voters approved the purchase of 3.7 additional acres in a February 1962 referendum. Finally, on May 28, 1963, voters approved a referendum to issue $2,850,000 in bonds to fund the construction of a high school. The name David Brearley Regional High School was chosen in March 1964 by the Regional District to honor David Brearley, one of four New Jersey residents to sign the Constitution of the United States, along with Jonathan Dayton and William Livingston, who had already had high schools in the district named for them. A groundbreaking ceremony was held in May 1964 for the new school facility, which was expected to be the first in the state with air conditioning and electric heating. The school opened to students in June 1966 for summer school courses, with 640 students from Kenilworth attending regular classes that fall. John L. Dixey served as the inaugural principal. The original building contained 40 classrooms, an auditorium with a capacity of 820, a cafeteria with a capacity of 430, a gymnasium with a capacity of 2,000, and offices. The building was also designed to be accessible by handicapped students, with all physically handicapped students in the district assigned to Brearley regardless of residency. Garwood students began to be phased into Brearley in September 1967.

By 1971, the school was becoming overcrowded, despite the addition of three temporary classrooms. On May 4, 1971, voters approved a $4.7 million bond referendum to expand and renovate each school in the district. At Brearley, a two-story addition, containing a special education room, business education room, two health classrooms, an expanded art room, and a large, flexible group area, opened in September 1973. A second gymnasium was added to the school in September 1976. By 1990, however, it had become apparent that closing one of the four Regional high schools would be an efficient cost-cutting measure. Brearley had shown a sixty percent decrease in enrollment since its opening, making it a prime candidate for closure. A Save our Schools campaign was quickly formed by concerned parents with the goal of keeping Brearley open. Despite pleas from parents, students, and community members, the Regional Board of Education voted 7-2 on November 17, 1992 to close Brearley in June 1993. Incoming Kenilworth students were sent to Jonathan Dayton High School in Springfield and incoming Garwood students were sent to Arthur L. Johnson High School in Clark, while current Brearley students were permitted to select which school they would like to attend. Over the next three years, the Save our Schools committee lobbied for the dissolution of the school district and the transfer of its four high schools to local control. A dissolution referendum was approved by voters May 1996. As such, the ownership of the Brearley building was transferred to the Kenilworth Board of Education. In September 1997, the school re-opened as the David Brearley Middle-High School. To boost enrollment, the seventh and eighth grades were moved from Harding School to Brearley, participation in the Interdistrict Public School Choice program began in September 2000, and a sending/receiving relationship with Winfield Township began to be phased in during September 2000.

In recent years, the Brearley Annex was completed to house the Alternate Education Program, the instructional media center was converted to a makerspace, library, and e-sports lab, and a $14.6 million bond referendum was approved for renovations and expansion of the building. The building projects were completed by September 2025 and included a two-story addition to house new high school science labs and segregate the middle school population (with sixth grade students moving to the building), along with renovations to the auditorium and athletic fields. As part of the building expansion, David Brearley Middle School and David Brearley High School were officially split into separate institutions for administrative and operational purposes effective September 2025.

== Awards, recognition and rankings ==
The school was the 194th-ranked public high school in New Jersey out of 339 schools statewide in New Jersey Monthly magazine's September 2014 cover story on the state's "Top Public High Schools", using a new ranking methodology. The school had been ranked 127th in the state of 328 schools in 2012, after being ranked 113th in 2010 out of 322 schools listed. The magazine ranked the school 178th in 2008 out of 316 schools.

== Curriculum and programs ==
In 2001, students from David Brearley High School and Hillside High School collaborated to develop literary and art projects about bigotry presented at an exhibit, "Making Connections: Two Culturally Diverse Schools Address Prejudice and Hatred by Studying the Holocaust Together." The exhibit was presented at Kean University, and was viewed together with local Holocaust survivors and concentration camp liberators.

== Athletics ==
The David Brearley High School Bears compete in the Union County Interscholastic Athletic Conference, which is comprised of public and private high schools in Union County and was established following a reorganization of sports leagues in Northern New Jersey by the New Jersey State Interscholastic Athletic Association (NJSIAA). Prior to the NJSIAA's 2009 realignment, the school had participated in the Mountain Valley Conference, which included public and private high schools in Essex and Union counties in northern New Jersey. With 358 students in grades 10-12, the school was classified by the NJSIAA for the 2019–20 school year as Group I for most athletic competition purposes, which included schools with an enrollment of 75 to 476 students in that grade range. The football team competes in Division 1A of the Big Central Football Conference, which includes 60 public and private high schools in Hunterdon, Middlesex, Somerset, Union and Warren counties, which are broken down into 10 divisions by size and location. The school was classified by the NJSIAA as Group I North for football for 2024–2026, which included schools with 254 to 474 students. School colors are navy and gold.

The school participates as the host school / lead agency in a joint cooperative wrestling team with Jonathan Dayton High School. In turn, Jonathan Dayton is the host school for a joint co-ed swimming team. These co-op programs operate under agreements scheduled to expire at the end of the 2027–28 school year.

=== Soccer ===
Brearley's boys soccer team won the Group I state title in 1990 (as co-champions with Haddonfield Memorial High School), 2013 (vs. New Egypt High School) and 2015 (vs. Arthur P. Schalick High School).

The 1990 team took a one-goal lead, but ended the Group I finals as co-champion after a 1–1 tie with Haddonfield.

Brearley won the Group I title in 2013 with a 3–0 win against New Egypt in the championship game played at The College of New Jersey.

The team won the Group I state championship in 2015 with a 1–0 victory over Arthur P. Schalick High School in the playoff finals. The game's lone goal came from Brearley's Justin Estremera; teammate Nick Minio shut down Schalick forward Michael D'Orio, who had scored in every tournament game until the final.

=== Football ===
Brearley's football team won the North II Group I state sectional title in 1981, 1985, 1986, 1991 and 2006.

The 1981 team finished the season with an 11–0 record after defeating Abraham Clark High School of Roselle by a score of 17-15 in the North II Group I sectional championship game.

Down 13-0 in the championship game's fourth quarter, the 1991 team mounted a comeback to defeat Mountain Lakes High School by a final score of 14-13 to win the North II Group I sectional title and finish the season with a record of 10-1.

The 2006 team defeated Verona High School by a score of 21-20 at Giants Stadium to win the North II Group I state sectional title.

=== Wrestling ===
David Brearley wrestling, operating in combination with Jonathan Dayton High School, won the 2011 Group II state championship at the Poland Spring Center in Toms River. The wrestling team won the Central Jersey Group I state sectional title in 2007 and the North Jersey Group II title in 2008-2012.

=== Cheerleading ===
The girls competition cheerleading team won the Group I NJCDCA state championship title in 2003, 2004, 2006, 2007, 2008, 2014 and 2023. They are also the reigning Mountain Valley Conference Champions.

=== Baseball ===
The Brearley baseball team won its first state sectional title when it won the 2009 Central Jersey Group I state sectional championship, defeating Point Pleasant Beach High School by a score of 6-4 in the tournament final.

== Administration ==
The school's principal is Vincent Cuccaro. His administration team includes the supervisor of student discipline, athletics, and special projects.

== Noted alumni ==
- Mike Chalenski (born 1970), former professional American football defensive lineman who played for six seasons in the National Football League
- Jack Grondin (class of 1969), drummer who was a founding member of the southern rock band 38 Special
- Sheldon Karlin (1950–2000), marathon runner who won the New York City Marathon in 1972
- Angelo Mongiovi (born 1952, class of 1970), wheelchair track, basketball, and rugby athlete inducted into the United States Quad Rugby Association Hall of Fame
- Tom Perrotta (born 1961, class of 1979), novelist and screenwriter
- Tony Siragusa (1967–2022, class of 1985), Indianapolis Colts and Baltimore Ravens defensive tackle and 'on-the-field' reporter for FOX NFL, starred in football and wrestling for David Brearley High School
