= Park Middle School =

Park Middle School may refer to one of several schools in the United States:

- Park Middle School (Lincoln, Nebraska) in Lincoln, Nebraska
- Scotch Plains-Fanwood Regional School District in Scotch Plains, New Jersey
- Park Middle School, part of the Antioch Unified School District in Antioch, California.
