= Union (CDP), New Jersey =

Populated place in Union County, New Jersey, US

Union, New Jersey
- Census-designated place
- Location in Union County Location in New Jersey Location in the United States
- Coordinates: 40°41′47″N 74°16′11″W
- Country: United States
- State: New Jersey
- County: Union
- Township: Union

Area
  - Total: 0.25 sq mi (0.66 km^{2})
  - Land: 0.25 sq mi (0.66 km^{2})
  - Water: 0 sq mi (0.00 km^{2})
- Elevation: 123 ft (37 m)

Population (2020)
  - Total: 2,229
  - Density: 8,740/sq mi (3,374.4/km^{2})
- Time zone: UTC−05:00 (Eastern (EST))
  - Summer (DST): UTC−04:00 (EDT)
- ZIP Code: 07083
- Area code: 908
- FIPS code: 34-74478
- GNIS feature ID: 2390415

Union is a census-designated place (CDP) comprising the downtown area of Union Township, Union County, in the U.S. state of New Jersey. It was first listed as a CDP prior to the 2010 census. The area is also known as Union Center.

The CDP is bordered by Caldwell Avenue and Falls Terrace to the northwest, by Vauxhall Avenue and Haines Avenue to the northeast, by Warren Avenue to the east, by the Garden State Parkway to the southeast, by Burke Parkway to the southwest, and by Bond Drie, Rosemont Avenue, Stuyvesant Avenue, and Elmwood Avenue to the south. Connecticut Farms borders the neighborhood to the south.

New Jersey Route 82 (Morris Avenue) is the main street through Union, leading southeast 4 miles (6 km) to Elizabeth and northwest 2 miles (3 km) to Springfield.

== Demographics ==
Historical population
Census	Pop.	Note	%±
2020	2,229		—
U.S. Decennial Census

Union first appeared as a census designated place in the 2020 U.S. census.

=== 2020 census ===
Union CDP, New Jersey – Racial and ethnic composition Note: the US Census treats Hispanic/Latino as an ethnic category. This table excludes Latinos from the racial categories and assigns them to a separate category. Hispanics/Latinos may be of any race.
Race / Ethnicity (NH = Non-Hispanic)	Pop 2020	% 2020
White alone (NH)	660	29.61%
Black or African American alone (NH)	565	25.35%
Native American or Alaska Native alone (NH)	5	0.22%
Asian alone (NH)	326	14.63%
Native Hawaiian or Pacific Islander alone (NH)	0	0.00%
Other Race alone (NH)	55	2.47%
Mixed race or Multiracial (NH)	93	4.17%
Hispanic or Latino (any race)	525	23.55%
Total	2,229	100.00%
