= Union County, New Jersey =

County in New Jersey, United States

- County
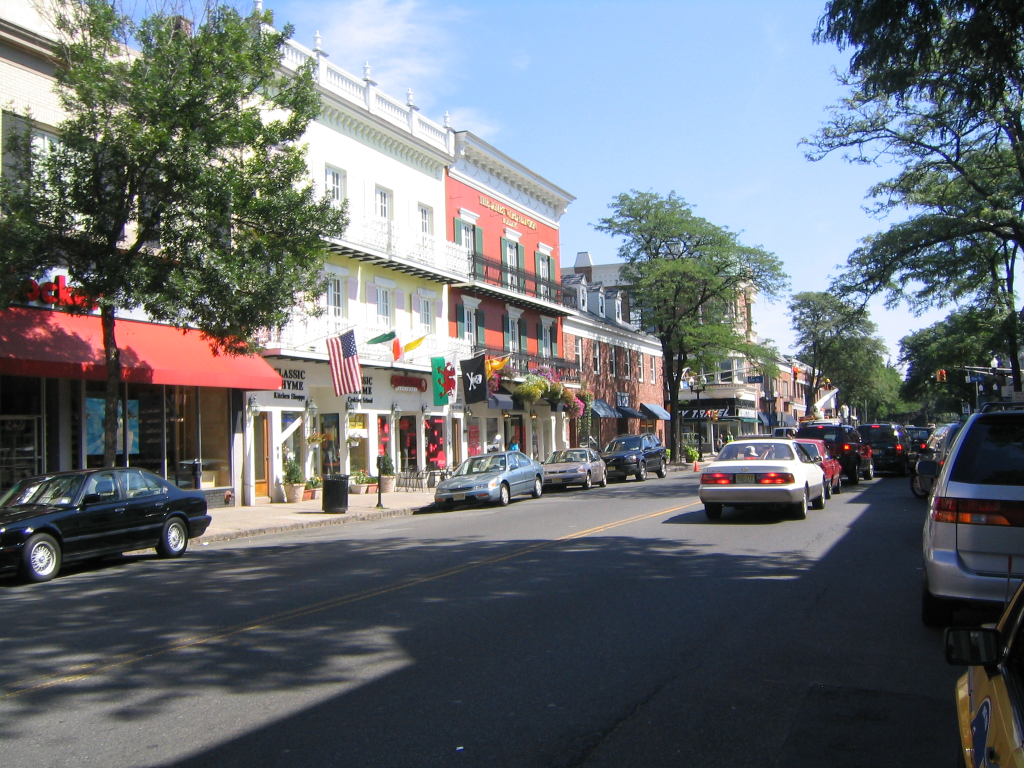
- Downtown Westfield in July 2005

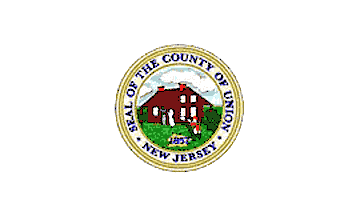
- Flag Seal

- Location within the U.S. state of New Jersey
- Interactive map of Union County, New Jersey
- Coordinates: 40.65°N 74.29°W
- Country: United States
- State: New Jersey
- Founded: 1857
- Named for: Union threatened by slavery dispute
- Seat: Elizabeth
- Largest city: Elizabeth (population and area)

Government
  - Commissioner Chair: Sergio Granados (D, term ends December 31, 2025)

Area
  - Total: 105.41 sq mi (273.0 km^{2})
  - Land: 102.77 sq mi (266.2 km^{2})
  - Water: 2.64 sq mi (6.8 km^{2}) 2.5%

Population (2020)
  - Total: 575,345
  - Estimate (2025): 601,863 ▲
  - Density: 5,598.4/sq mi (2,161.5/km^{2})
- Time zone: UTC−5 (Eastern)
  - Summer (DST): UTC−4 (EDT)
- Congressional districts: 7th, 8th, 10th, 12th
- Website: www.ucnj.org

Union County is a county in the northern-central part of the U.S. state of New Jersey. As of the 2020 United States census, the county was the state's seventh-most-populous county with a population of 575,345, its highest decennial count ever and an increase of 38,846 (+7.2%) from the 2010 census count of 536,499. The United States Census Bureau's Population Estimates Program estimated a 2025 population of 601,863, an increase of 26,518 (+4.6%) from the 2020 decennial census. Its county seat is Elizabeth, which is also the most populous municipality in the county, with a 2020 census population of 137,298, and the largest by area, covering 13.46 square miles (34.9 km^{2}). The county is part of the Central Jersey region of the state.

In 2015, the county had a per capita personal income of $60,089, the seventh-highest in New Jersey and ranked 152nd of 3,113 counties in the United States. The Bureau of Economic Analysis ranked the county as having the 119th-highest per capita income of all 3,113 counties in the United States (and the eighth-highest in New Jersey) in 2009. A study by Forbes.com determined that Union County residents pay the second-highest property taxes of all U.S. counties, based on 2007 data.

With a population density of 4,955 inhabitants per square mile (1,913/km^{2}) in 2000, Union County was the 15th-most densely populated county in the United States as of the 2010 Census, and third-densest in New Jersey, behind Hudson County (ranked 6th nationwide at 9,754 per square mile) and Essex County (ranked 11th at 6,126).

== History ==
=== Etymology ===
Established in 1857 as the last county created in New Jersey, it was named after the Union threatened by slavery dispute during this period, which would erupt into civil war in 1861.

=== History ===
All of present-day Union County was part of the Elizabethtown Tract, which was purchased in 1664, by English colonists from the Lenape Native Americans that lived in the area of present-day Elizabeth, New Jersey. Union County was formed on March 19, 1857, from portions of Essex County; it was the last of New Jersey's 21 counties to be established.

Many historic places and structures are to be found in the county, including on the National Register of Historic Places listings in Union County, New Jersey.

In the fall, Union County holds its annual "Four Centuries in a Weekend" festival for the public, celebrating and touring historic buildings, museums and sites in the county.

== Geography ==
According to the U.S. Census Bureau, as of the 2020 Census, the county had a total area of 105.41 square miles (273.0 km^{2}), of which 102.77 square miles (266.2 km^{2}) was land (97.5%) and 2.64 square miles (6.8 km^{2}) was water (2.5%).

Much of Union County is relatively flat and low-lying. Only in the northwestern corner does any significant relief appear as the Watchung Mountains cross the county. It is there that highest elevations, two areas approximately 560 feet (170 m) above sea level, are found in Berkeley Heights. The lowest elevation is sea level along the eastern shore at the Arthur Kill.

=== Rivers, lakes and streams ===
- Arthur Kill
- Rahway River
- Elizabeth River
- Nomahegan Brook
- Marshes Creek
- Morses Creek
- Peach Orchard Brook
- Robinson's Brook
- Robinson's Branch Reservoir

=== Climate and weather ===
Elizabeth, New Jersey

Climate chart (precipitation, max. and min. temperature)
J	F	M	A	M	J	J	A	S	O	N	D
3.5 39 24	2.9 42 27	4.1 51 34	4.2 62 44	4 72 53	4 82 63	4.7 86 69	3.7 84 68	3.8 77 60	3.6 65 48	3.6 55 39	3.8 44 30
- █ Average max. and min. temperatures in °F
- █ Precipitation totals in inches
- Source: The Weather Channel
Metric conversion
J	F	M	A	M	J	J	A	S	O	N	D
89 4 −4	74 6 −3	104 11 1	107 17 7	102 22 12	102 28 17	119 30 21	94 29 20	97 25 16	91 18 9	91 13 4	97 7 −1
- █ Average max. and min. temperatures in °C
- █ Precipitation totals in mm

In recent years, average temperatures in the county seat of Elizabeth have ranged from a low of 24 °F (−4 °C) in January to a high of 86 °F (30 °C) in July, although a record low of −14 °F (−26 °C) was recorded in February 1934 and a record high of 105 °F (41 °C) was recorded in July 1993. Average monthly precipitation ranged from 2.99 inches (76 mm) in February to 4.76 inches (121 mm) in July. In Berkeley Heights average monthly temperatures range from 29.4 °F in January to 74.7 °F in July. The climate in the county is hot-summer humid continental (Dfa) in the west and humid subtropical (Cfa) in the east. The hardiness zone is 7a west of the Garden State Parkway and 7b to the east.

== Demographics ==
Historical population
Census	Pop.	Note	%±
1860	27,780		—
1870	41,859		50.7%
1880	55,571		32.8%
1890	72,467		30.4%
1900	99,353		37.1%
1910	140,197		41.1%
1920	200,157		42.8%
1930	305,209		52.5%
1940	328,344		7.6%
1950	398,138		21.3%
1960	504,255		26.7%
1970	543,116		7.7%
1980	504,094		−7.2%
1990	493,819		−2.0%
2000	522,541		5.8%
2010	536,499		2.7%
2020	575,345		7.2%
2025 (est.)	601,863		4.6%
Historical sources: 1790–1990; 1970–2010 2000; 2010 2000–2010 2010-2020

Union County is ethnically diverse. Berkeley Heights, Clark, Roselle Park, Cranford, Kenilworth, Linden, New Providence, Scotch Plains, Springfield, Summit, Union and Westfield have high percentages of Italian American residents. Elizabeth, Plainfield, Rahway, Roselle and Union all have large African American communities. Roselle Park has a notably large Indian American community, while Roselle Park, Roselle, Linden, Rahway, Plainfield and particularly Elizabeth have fast-growing Hispanic and Portuguese populations.

The county's Jewish population was 35,000 as of 2004, with notable communities located in Cranford, Elizabeth, Hillside, Linden, Scotch Plains, Springfield, Union, and Westfield.

=== 2020 census ===
As of the 2020 census, the county had a population of 575,345. The median age was 38.7 years. 23.4% of residents were under the age of 18 and 14.3% of residents were 65 years of age or older. For every 100 females there were 93.5 males, and for every 100 females age 18 and over there were 90.6 males age 18 and over.

The racial makeup of the county was 41.1% White, 20.4% Black or African American, 0.7% American Indian and Alaska Native, 5.6% Asian, <0.1% Native Hawaiian and Pacific Islander, 18.4% from some other race, and 13.8% from two or more races. Hispanic or Latino residents of any race comprised 34.0% of the population.

100.0% of residents lived in urban areas, while <0.1% lived in rural areas.

There were 200,372 households in the county, of which 37.0% had children under the age of 18 living in them. Of all households, 48.9% were married-couple households, 16.6% were households with a male householder and no spouse or partner present, and 28.5% were households with a female householder and no spouse or partner present. About 23.2% of all households were made up of individuals and 10.0% had someone living alone who was 65 years of age or older.

There were 209,908 housing units, of which 4.5% were vacant. Among occupied housing units, 56.4% were owner-occupied and 43.6% were renter-occupied. The homeowner vacancy rate was 1.4% and the rental vacancy rate was 4.0%.

=== Racial and ethnic composition ===
Union County, New Jersey – Racial and ethnic composition Note: the US Census treats Hispanic/Latino as an ethnic category. This table excludes Latinos from the racial categories and assigns them to a separate category. Hispanics/Latinos may be of any race.
Race / Ethnicity (NH = Non-Hispanic)	Pop 1980	Pop 1990	Pop 2000	Pop 2010	Pop 2020	% 1980	% 1990	% 2000	% 2010	% 2020
White alone (NH)	375,032	322,247	283,345	243,312	211,245	74.40%	65.26%	54.22%	45.35%	36.72%
Black or African American alone (NH)	79,979	89,222	104,926	111,705	112,261	15.87%	18.07%	20.08%	20.82%	19.51%
Native American or Alaska Native alone (NH)	466	668	547	546	552	0.09%	0.14%	0.10%	0.10%	0.10%
Asian alone (NH)	6,238	13,164	19,789	24,496	31,963	1.24%	2.67%	3.79%	4.57%	5.56%
Native Hawaiian or Pacific Islander alone (NH)	x	x	121	107	78	x	x	0.02%	0.02%	0.01%
Other race alone (NH)	1,623	721	1,462	2,279	6,190	0.32%	0.15%	0.28%	0.42%	1.08%
Mixed race or Multiracial (NH)	x	x	9,340	7,350	17,537	x	x	1.79%	1.37%	3.05%
Hispanic or Latino (any race)	40,756	67,797	103,011	146,704	195,519	8.09%	13.73%	19.71%	27.34%	33.98%
Total	504,094	493,819	522,541	536,499	575,345	100.00%	100.00%	100.00%	100.00%	100.00%

==== Racial / Ethnic Profile of places in Union County, New Jersey ====
Racial / Ethnic Profile of places in Union County, New Jersey (2020 Census)
Following is a table of towns and census designated places in Union County, New Jersey. Data for the United States (with and without Puerto Rico), the state of New Jersey, and Union County itself have been included for comparison purposes.
The majority racial/ethnic group is coded per the key below.

Majority minority with no dominant group
Majority White
Majority Black
Majority Hispanic
Majority Asian

Racial and ethnic composition of places in Union County, New Jersey (2020 Census) (NH = Non-Hispanic) Note: the US Census treats Hispanic/Latino as an ethnic category. This table excludes Latinos from the racial categories and assigns them to a separate category. Hispanics/Latinos may be of any race.
Place	Designation	Total Population	White alone (NH)	%	Black or African American alone (NH)	%	Native American or Alaska Native alone (NH)	%	Asian alone (NH)	%	Pacific Islander alone (NH)	%	Other race alone (NH)	%	Mixed race or Multiracial (NH)	%	Hispanic or Latino (any race)	%
United States of America (50 states and D.C.)	x	331,449,281	191,697,647	57.84%	39,940,338	12.05%	2,251,699	0.68%	19,618,719	5.92%	622,018	0.19%	1,689,833	0.51%	13,548,983	4.09%	62,080,044	18.73%
United States of America (50 states, D.C., and Puerto Rico)	x	334,735,155	191,722,195	57.28%	39,944,624	11.93%	2,252,011	0.67%	19,621,465	5.86%	622,109	0.19%	1,692,341	0.51%	13,551,323	4.05%	65,329,087	19.52%
New Jersey	State	9,288,994	4,816,381	51.85%	1,154,142	12.42%	11,206	0.12%	942,921	10.15%	1,944	0.02%	70,354	0.76%	289,471	3.12%	2,002,575	21.56%
Union County	County	575,345	211,245	36.72%	112,261	19.51%	552	0.10%	31,963	5.56%	78	0.01%	6,190	1.08%	17,537	3.05%	195,519	33.98%
Berkeley Heights	township	13,285	9,278	69.84%	242	1.82%	5	0.04%	2,065	15.54%	1	0.01%	84	0.63%	470	3.54%	1,140	8.58%
Clark	township	15,544	12,346	79.43%	231	1.49%	4	0.03%	644	4.14%	3	0.02%	46	0.30%	325	2.09%	1,945	12.51%
Connecticut Farms	CDP	545	235	43.12%	87	15.96%	1	0.18%	51	9.36%	0	0.00%	9	1.65%	20	3.67%	142	26.06%
Cranford	township	23,847	18,946	79.45%	653	2.74%	6	0.03%	903	3.79%	4	0.02%	106	0.44%	786	3.30%	2,443	10.24%
Cranford	CDP	2,032	1,514	74.51%	92	4.53%	3	0.15%	95	4.68%	0	0.00%	15	0.74%	68	3.35%	245	12.06%
Elizabeth	city	137,298	16,553	12.06%	22,261	16.21%	152	0.11%	2,757	2.01%	18	0.01%	2,145	1.56%	3,179	2.32%	90,233	65.72%
Fanwood	borough	7,774	5,604	72.09%	386	4.97%	3	0.04%	713	9.17%	2	0.03%	11	0.14%	326	4.19%	729	9.38%
Garwood	borough	4,454	3,436	77.14%	69	1.55%	1	0.02%	119	2.67%	0	0.00%	32	0.72%	127	2.85%	670	15.04%
Hillside	township	22,456	3,787	16.86%	11,327	50.44%	25	0.11%	498	2.22%	0	0.00%	537	2.39%	1,093	4.87%	5,189	23.11%
Kean University	CDP	1,522	534	35.09%	614	40.34%	2	0.13%	59	3.88%	0	0.00%	8	0.53%	25	1.64%	280	18.40%
Kenilworth	borough	8,427	5,524	65.55%	219	2.60%	8	0.09%	435	5.16%	2	0.02%	38	0.45%	268	3.18%	1,933	22.94%
Linden	city	43,738	13,744	31.42%	11,722	26.80%	33	0.08%	1,484	3.39%	5	0.01%	541	1.24%	1,154	2.64%	15,055	34.42%
Mountainside	borough	7,020	5,498	78.32%	134	1.91%	2	0.03%	466	6.64%	0	0.00%	50	0.71%	203	2.89%	667	9.50%
New Providence	borough	13,650	9,429	69.08%	241	1.77%	7	0.05%	2,171	15.90%	2	0.01%	60	0.44%	489	3.58%	1,251	9.16%
Plainfield	city	54,586	3,383	6.20%	19,034	34.87%	104	0.19%	500	0.92%	8	0.01%	634	1.16%	1,131	2.07%	29,792	54.58%
Rahway	city	29,556	8,913	30.16%	8,892	30.09%	40	0.14%	1,622	5.49%	4	0.01%	228	0.77%	990	3.35%	8,867	30.00%
Roselle	borough	22,695	2,474	10.90%	10,800	47.59%	37	0.16%	580	2.56%	7	0.03%	222	0.98%	675	2.97%	7,900	34.81%
Scotch Plains	township	24,968	16,297	65.27%	2,365	9.47%	14	0.06%	2,610	10.45%	0	0.00%	145	0.58%	958	3.84%	2,579	10.33%
Springfield	township	17,178	11,140	64.85%	1,504	8.76%	7	0.04%	1,541	8.97%	1	0.01%	131	0.76%	619	3.60%	2,235	13.01%
Springfield	CDP	1,518	917	60.41%	102	6.72%	1	0.07%	114	7.51%	0	0.00%	14	0.92%	81	5.34%	289	19.04%
Summit	city	22,719	15,016	66.09%	895	3.94%	8	0.04%	2,371	10.44%	5	0.02%	126	0.55%	985	4.34%	3,313	14.58%
Union	township	59,728	19,146	32.06%	19,296	32.31%	68	0.11%	6,472	10.84%	13	0.02%	766	1.28%	2,068	3.46%	11,899	19.92%
Union	CDP	2,229	660	29.61%	565	25.35%	5	0.22%	326	14.63%	0	0.00%	55	2.47%	93	4.17%	525	23.55%
Vauxhall	CDP	5,251	354	6.74%	3,825	72.84%	12	0.23%	165	3.14%	0	0.00%	57	1.09%	147	2.80%	691	13.16%
Westfield	town	31,032	23,819	76.76%	790	2.55%	19	0.06%	2,735	8.81%	1	0.00%	150	0.48%	1,271	4.10%	2,247	7.24%
Winfield	township	1,423	1,187	83.42%	14	0.98%	2	0.14%	6	0.42%	1	0.07%	2	0.14%	72	5.06%	139	9.77%

=== 2010 census ===
The 2010 United States census counted 536,499 people, 188,118 households, and 134,692 families in the county. The population density was 5,216.1 inhabitants per square mile (2,013.9/km^{2}). There were 199,489 housing units at an average density of 1,939.5 per square mile (748.8/km^{2}). The racial makeup was 61.33% (329,052) White, 22.05% (118,313) Black or African American, 0.39% (2,080) Native American, 4.63% (24,839) Asian, 0.03% (163) Pacific Islander, 8.48% (45,496) from other races, and 3.09% (16,556) from two or more races. Hispanic or Latino people of any race were 27.34% (146,704) of the population.

Of the 188,118 households, 34.4% had children under the age of 18; 50.1% were married couples living together; 15.6% had a female householder with no husband present and 28.4% were non-families. Of all households, 23.6% were made up of individuals and 9.7% had someone living alone who was 65 years of age or older. The average household size was 2.82 and the average family size was 3.32.

24.5% of the population were under the age of 18, 8.6% from 18 to 24, 27.5% from 25 to 44, 26.8% from 45 to 64, and 12.6% who were 65 years of age or older. The median age was 38 years. For every 100 females, the population had 94 males. For every 100 females ages 18 and older there were 90.7 males.

== Government ==
=== County government ===
The Union County Courthouse prior to 1900

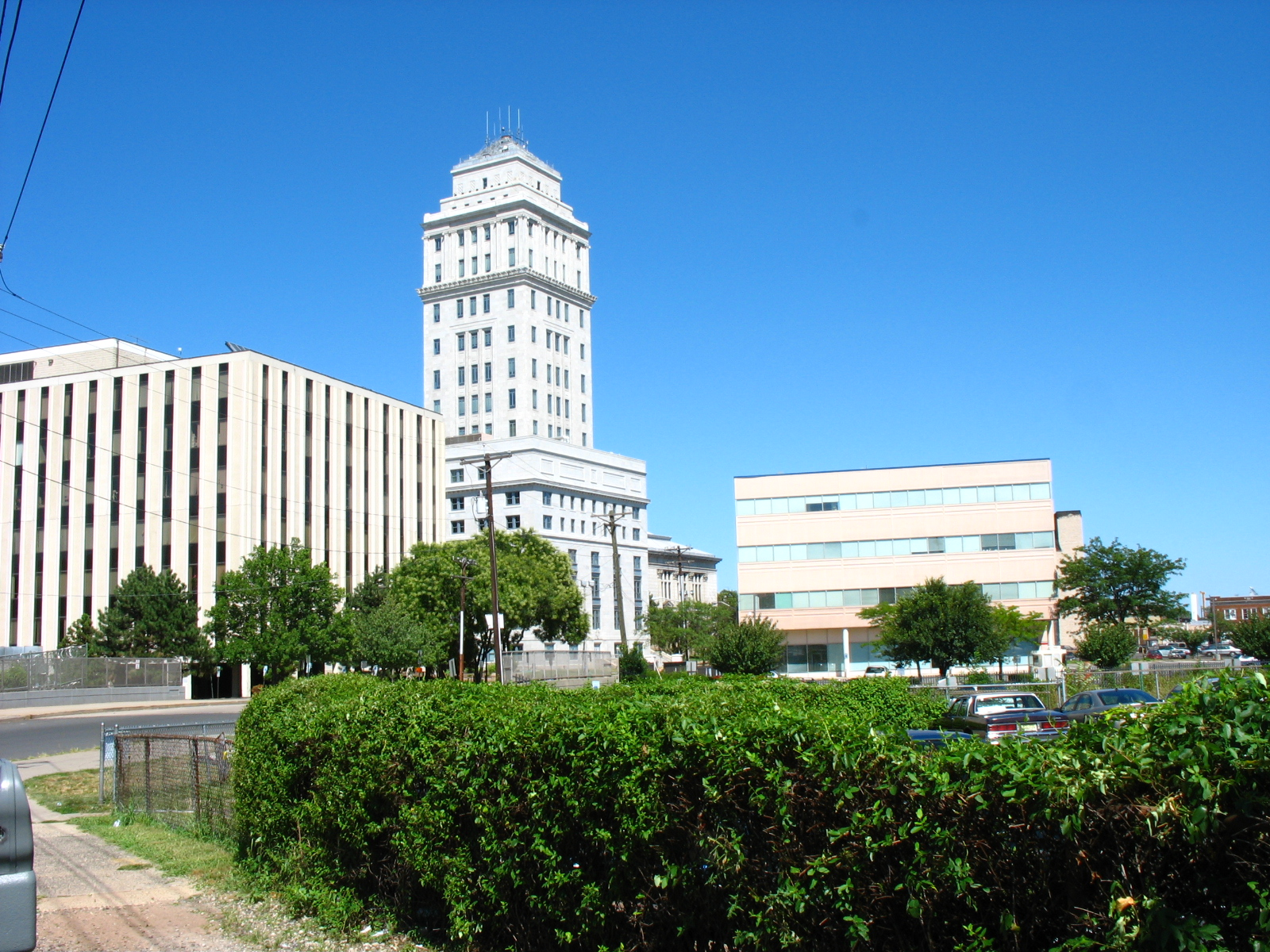
Union County Courthouse in Elizabeth

Union County is governed by a nine-member Board of County Commissioners. The members are elected at-large in partisan elections to serve three-year terms on a staggered basis, with three seats coming up for election each year. The board sets policies for the operation of the county. The Commissioners perform the county's legislative and executive functions. In their legislative role, they formulate and adopt a budget and set county policies and procedures. In their executive role, they oversee county spending and functioning. Many of the administrative duties are delegated by the Board of County Commissioners to the County Manager. Each of the commissioners serves on various committees and boards as a part of their duties. These include committees on Economic Development, Parks and Recreation, and Public Works and Policy. In addition, the board oversees the county's Open Space Trust Fund. Day-to-day operation of the county and its departments is supervised by an appointed County Manager, Edward Oatman. In 2016, freeholders were paid $30,692, while the Freeholder vice chairman received $31,732 and the Freeholder chairman had an annual salary of $32,773. The County Manager is Edward Oatman. No Republican has been elected to countywide office since 1995.

Union County is governed by a Board of County Commissioners, whose nine members are elected at-large to three-year terms of office on a staggered basis with three seats coming up for election each year, with an appointed County Manager overseeing the day-to-day operations of the county. At an annual reorganization meeting held in the beginning of January, the board selects a chair and vice chair from among its members. As of 2025, Union County's County Commissioners are (with terms for Chair and Vice-Chair ending every December 31):

Commissioner	Party, residence, term
Chair Kimberly Palmieri-Mouded	D, Westfield, 2027
Vice Chair Lourdes M. Leon	D, Elizabeth, 2026
James E. Baker Jr.	D, Rahway, 2027
Joseph Bodek	D, Linden, 2026
Michele Delisfort	D, Union Township, 2026
Sergio Granados	D, Elizabeth, 2025
Bette Jane Kowalski	D, Cranford, 2025
Alexander Mirabella	D, Fanwood, 2027
Rebecca Williams	D, Plainfield, 2025

Constitutional officers elected on a countywide basis are:

Office	Party, residence, term
County Clerk Joanne Rajoppi	D, Westfield, 2025
Sheriff Peter Corvelli	D, Kenilworth, 2026
Surrogate Christopher E. Hudak	D, Clark, 2027

Union County constitutes Vicinage 12 of the New Jersey Superior Court and is seated at the Union County Courthouse in Elizabeth, with additional facilities also located in Elizabeth; the Assignment Judge for Vicinage 12 is Karen M. Cassidy. Law enforcement at the county level includes the Union County Police Department, the Union County Sheriff's Office, and the Union County Prosecutor's Office. Union County's Acting Prosecutor is Michael A. Monahan.

=== Notable events in county government ===
In 2023, Union County agreed to honor the site in North Jersey of what local activists described as the public execution by burning at the stake of three enslaved New Jerseyans in 1741. In 2023, the county worked to revise its logo, which has had what has been described as the only county seal in the nation that depicts a woman being killed. The logo depicted Hannah Caldwell being shot by a British light infantryman during the Battle of Connecticut Farms. In 2023, Union County moved to revise its county seal, asking residents to participate in an online poll to choose between two alternatives, both of which eliminate the depiction of Caldwell's death. In 2022, controversy erupted over the county's deletion of negative social media comments made about the opening of Tëmike Park, an LGBTQ-inclusive playground, in Cedar Brook Park. In 2022, a state court found the county illegally circumvented the public bidding process in awarding contracts for the construction of a proposed Union County government building in Elizabeth.

In 2015, the county was forced to pay legal fees after losing a trademark claim it brought against a frequent county government critic who used the County of Union seal on her blog. In 2011, an investigation found mismanagement of county funds in association with MusicFest, a free annual concert. In 2009, following a First Amendment challenge by the American Civil Liberties Union, the county commissioners agreed to issue a public apology for cutting off speech by a resident who was addressing the board about possible nepotism on the county payroll.

=== Federal representatives ===
Four Congressional Districts cover the county, including portions of the 7th, 8th, 10th and 12th districts. For the 119th United States Congress, New Jersey's 7th congressional district is represented by Thomas Kean Jr. (R, Westfield). For the 119th United States Congress, New Jersey's 8th congressional district is represented by Rob Menendez (D, Jersey City). For the 119th United States Congress, New Jersey's 10th congressional district is represented by LaMonica McIver (D, Newark). For the 119th United States Congress, New Jersey's 12th congressional district is represented by Bonnie Watson Coleman (D, Ewing Township).

=== State representatives ===
The 21 municipalities of Union County are represented by four legislative districts.

District	Senator	Assembly	Municipalities
20th	Joseph Cryan (D)	Annette Quijano (D) Eduardo Rodriguez (D)	Elizabeth, Kenilworth, Roselle, and Union Township.
21st	Jon Bramnick (R)	Vincent Kearney (D) Andrew Macurdy (D)	Berkeley Heights, Garwood, Mountainside, New Providence, Springfield Township, Summit, and Westfield. The remainder of this district covers portions of Morris County, Middlesex County, and Somerset County.
22nd	Nicholas Scutari (D)	James Kennedy (D) Linda Carter (D)	Clark, Cranford, Fanwood, Linden, Plainfield, Rahway, Roselle Park, Scotch Plains, and Winfield. The remainder of this district covers portions of Somerset County.
28th	Renee Burgess (D)	Chigozie Onyema (D) Cleopatra Tucker (D)	Hillside. The remainder of this district covers portions of Essex County.

=== Law enforcement ===
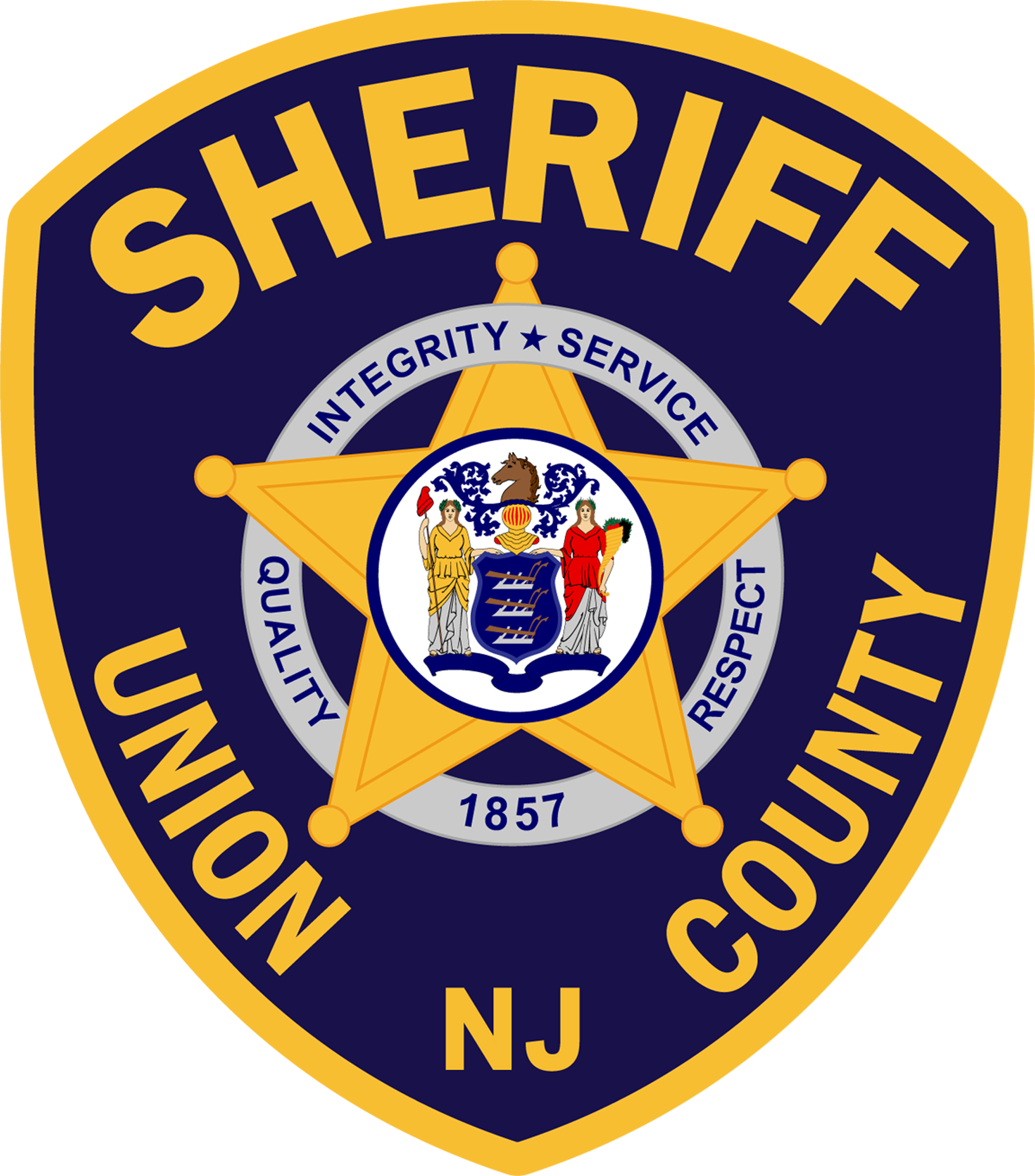
Union County Sheriff's Office

The Union County Sheriff's Office is located in Elizabeth, New Jersey. It is currently headed by Peter Corvelli. It was headed by Ralph Froehlich, a Union resident who was first elected in 1977 and served in office for 37 years, making him the longest-serving Sheriff in New Jersey history. There are two top deputies, known as undersheriffs, and they are Dennis Burke and Amilcar Colon. A 1981 investigation of the Union County Jail reviewed issues relating to overcrowding, escapes, escape attempts and suicides in the detention facility.

On July 1, 2021, the Sheriff's Office regained control of the Union County Jail and made it a division within the organization; the Division of Corrections. The New Jersey State Policemen's Benevolent Association Local 108 is the official labor union and the collective bargaining agent for the Sheriff's Officers of Union County. This body is subdivided into Local 108 for the line officers and Local 108A for the supervisors (sergeants, lieutenants, and captains).

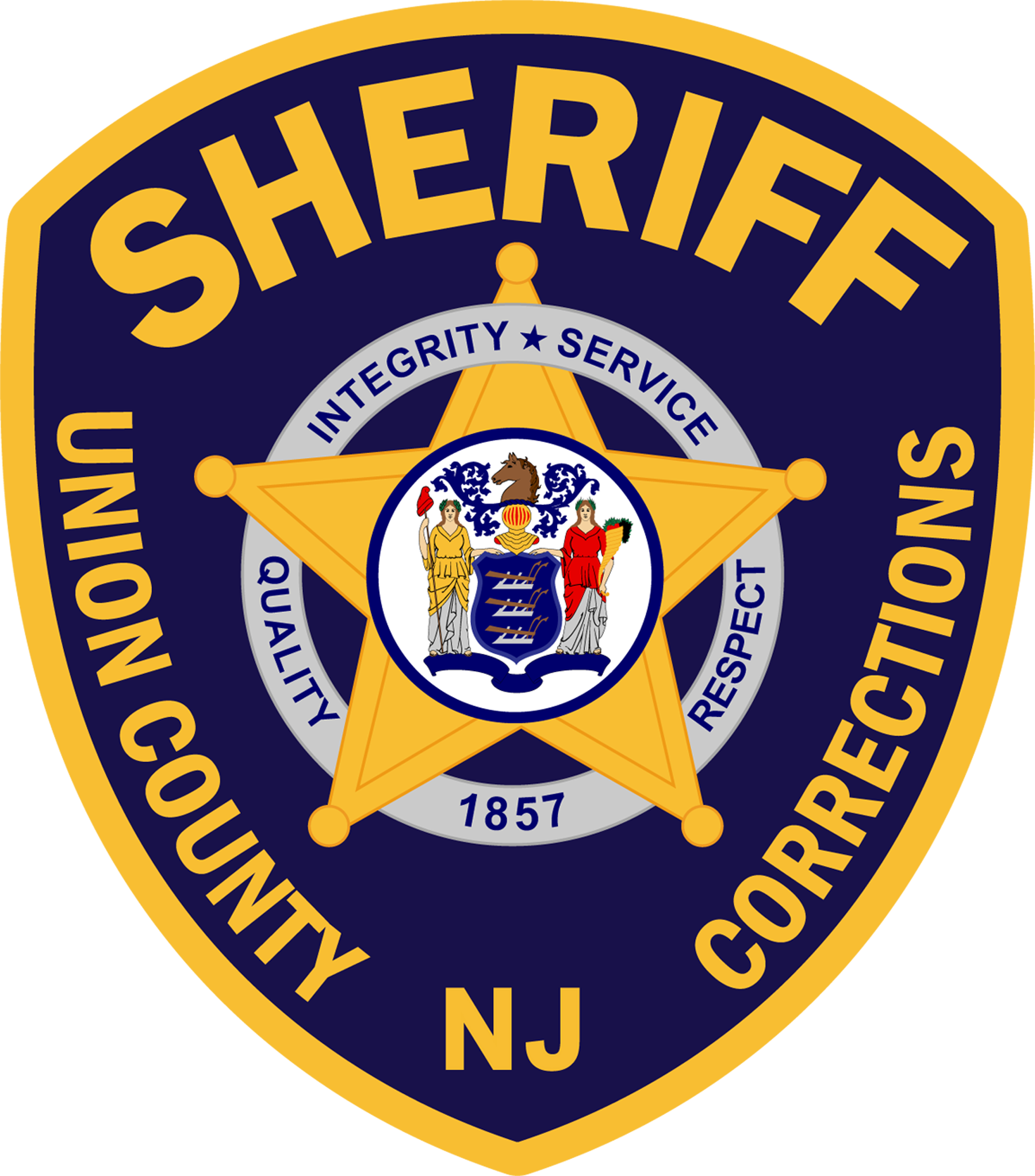
Union County Sheriff's Office - Division of Corrections

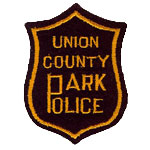
Union County Park Police

The Union County Police Department operates independently of the Sheriff's office. The Union County Police Department originally began as the Union County Park Police. The Union County Police are tasked with patrolling Union County's properties. They also supplement the local municipalities with police presence and patrol when requested. Martin Mogensen has been the Chief of Police since February 2023.

The Union County Police have several divisions and are relied upon for their multiple services. Currently assigned are Patrol, Detective Bureau, Emergency Services Unit, and the Marine Unit. Union County Regional 911 and Dispatch is one of the many services that the County Police provide. They are the primary PSAP for multiple municipalities, provide police/fire/EMS dispatch, dispatch medics, and Union County Fire Mutual Aid. The PD belongs to the New Jersey State Policemen's Benevolent Association, Local 73.

=== Symbols ===
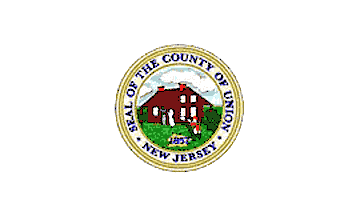
The flag of Union County with its seal depicting the murder of Hannah Caldwell.

The flag and seal of Union County depict the murder of Hannah Caldwell, the wife of James Caldwell, by British soldiers during the Battle of Connecticut Farms. After killing her the British troops burned the house and neighboring church as well as most of the town. Her death inspired many people to join both the New Jersey militia and the Continental Army. The seal was adopted in 1932 and has been official since 1933.

Beginning in fall of 2020 then County Commission Chairman Sergio Granados began exploring changing the seal at the urging of Mothers Against Domestic Violence who argued the scene was offensive and encouraged Domestic Violence. Neither the general public, nor either the Union Township nor Union County Historical Societies would be informed of these efforts until it was leaked in 2022. Granados and the county government stated that there would be a poll to determine the seals replacement, either a depiction of the Union County Courthouse or a quartered design with other local symbols. Retaining the existing seal was not an option.

The proposal saw significant public backlash, with a petition reaching 6,600 county resident signatures to retain the current seal. Granados then defended his decision to change the seal, arguing that "the picture on the current seal is not a true depiction of what actually occurred" as Caldwell was shot looking out her window, not while standing in the doorway. This is despite the county not offering a corrected, historically accurate depiction, as one of the replacement options. In 2023 Granados ultimately backtracked and "postponed" the redesign indefinitely. As of 2026 the existing seal is still in use.

== Politics ==
United States presidential election results for Union County, New Jersey
Year	Republican		Democratic		Third party(ies)	
Year	No.	%	No.	%	No.	%
1896	11,707	61.58%	6,073	31.95%	1,230	6.47%
1900	12,533	58.95%	7,667	36.06%	1,061	4.99%
1904	13,906	58.92%	8,574	36.33%	1,120	4.75%
1908	15,920	60.90%	8,809	33.70%	1,414	5.41%
1912	5,421	21.55%	9,695	38.54%	10,040	39.91%
1916	16,705	59.21%	10,328	36.61%	1,181	4.19%
1920	39,409	72.57%	12,103	22.29%	2,791	5.14%
1924	50,356	67.99%	14,738	19.90%	8,966	12.11%
1928	68,119	64.21%	37,476	35.32%	497	0.47%
1932	67,512	54.91%	51,357	41.77%	4,092	3.33%
1936	59,553	45.08%	70,813	53.61%	1,731	1.31%
1940	79,962	52.50%	70,737	46.45%	1,597	1.05%
1944	86,543	52.57%	75,969	46.15%	2,113	1.28%
1948	87,402	53.89%	66,759	41.16%	8,019	4.94%
1952	122,885	60.46%	78,336	38.54%	2,024	1.00%
1956	146,228	67.57%	67,540	31.21%	2,646	1.22%
1960	123,224	50.29%	119,986	48.97%	1,798	0.73%
1964	82,999	33.29%	164,989	66.17%	1,359	0.55%
1968	110,309	45.72%	109,674	45.46%	21,273	8.82%
1972	148,290	61.03%	90,482	37.24%	4,201	1.73%
1976	118,019	51.56%	106,267	46.42%	4,616	2.02%
1980	112,288	51.66%	86,074	39.60%	18,977	8.73%
1984	135,446	59.11%	92,056	40.17%	1,638	0.71%
1988	112,967	54.27%	93,158	44.75%	2,028	0.97%
1992	87,742	41.76%	96,671	46.01%	25,699	12.23%
1996	65,912	34.65%	108,102	56.82%	16,227	8.53%
2000	68,554	36.78%	112,003	60.10%	5,816	3.12%
2004	82,517	40.55%	119,372	58.66%	1,613	0.79%
2008	78,768	35.41%	141,417	63.58%	2,241	1.01%
2012	68,314	32.52%	139,752	66.52%	2,022	0.96%
2016	68,114	30.47%	147,414	65.94%	8,042	3.60%
2020	80,038	31.62%	170,310	67.29%	2,744	1.08%
2024	89,063	37.01%	147,327	61.23%	4,242	1.76%

Union County was strongly Republican for most of the 20th century. From 1896 to 1988, it only supported a Democrat for president three times, in 1912, 1936, and 1964. Since the 1990s, it has swung hard to the Democrats, and is now one of the most Democratic counties in New Jersey. In the 2020 election, Democrat Joe Biden received the highest share of the vote for a Democrat in the county's history. As of October 1, 2021, there were a total of 362,501 registered voters in Union County, of whom 178,449 (49.2%) were registered as Democrats, 57,878 (16.0%) were registered as Republicans and 121,478 (33.5%) were registered as unaffiliated. There were 4,696 voters (1.3%) registered to other parties. Among the county's 2010 Census population, 53.3% were registered to vote, including 70.6% of those ages 18 and over.

Senate Class 1 election results

United States Senate election results for Union County, New Jersey1
Year	Republican		Democratic		Third party(ies)	
Year	No.	%	No.	%	No.	%
2024	79,183	35.63%	138,186	62.18%	4,855	2.18%
2018	60,758	33.09%	117,937	64.22%	4,938	2.69%
2012	58,929	31.39%	125,635	66.92%	3,180	1.69%
2006	52,496	40.26%	75,166	57.65%	2,732	2.10%
2000	77,111	44.08%	93,879	53.67%	3,939	2.25%
1994	60,195	45.00%	70,904	53.01%	2,661	1.99%
1988	88,027	44.09%	109,852	55.02%	1,775	0.89%
1982	81,211	48.64%	83,436	49.97%	2,325	1.39%

Senate Class 2 election results

United States Senate election results for Union County, New Jersey2
Year	Republican		Democratic		Third party(ies)	
Year	No.	%	No.	%	No.	%
2020	76,677	30.96%	166,997	67.42%	4,014	1.62%
2014	34,741	33.20%	68,051	65.03%	1,855	1.77%
2013	27,152	35.30%	48,991	63.68%	785	1.02%
2008	69,069	36.57%	116,201	61.53%	3,578	1.89%
2002	49,243	40.56%	70,085	57.73%	2,074	1.71%
1996	69,781	39.00%	99,356	55.53%	9,784	5.47%
1990	57,628	45.19%	66,716	52.31%	3,184	2.50%
1984	74,446	34.01%	142,320	65.03%	2,102	0.96%

=== State elections ===
Governor election results

Gubernatorial election results for Union County, New Jersey
Year	Republican		Democratic		Third party(ies)	
Year	No.	%	No.	%	No.	%
2025	59,646	32.19%	124,470	67.18%	1,162	0.63%
2021	51,279	37.62%	83,913	61.56%	1,126	0.83%
2017	39,552	32.62%	79,113	65.24%	2,594	2.14%
2013	58,135	51.19%	53,869	47.43%	1,560	1.37%
2009	56,769	42.15%	68,867	51.13%	9,057	6.72%
2005	50,036	37.99%	77,982	59.21%	3,677	2.79%
2001	50,780	38.40%	79,682	60.25%	1,790	1.35%
1997	68,721	46.60%	69,673	47.25%	9,065	6.15%
1993	76,359	48.68%	76,552	48.80%	3,950	2.52%
1989	53,636	36.71%	89,419	61.21%	3,039	2.08%
1985	102,411	73.33%	35,060	25.10%	2,187	1.57%
1981	91,940	53.38%	78,251	45.44%	2,030	1.18%
1977	77,695	47.06%	82,130	49.75%	5,273	3.19%
1973	50,010	30.05%	113,678	68.30%	2,759	1.66%
1969	107,997	54.99%	82,618	42.07%	5,785	2.95%
1965	78,820	42.80%	103,067	55.96%	2,277	1.24%
1961	97,205	51.31%	90,912	47.99%	1,313	0.69%
1957	74,851	43.72%	94,430	55.16%	1,911	1.12%
1953	61,973	43.65%	76,144	53.63%	3,865	2.72%

== Education ==
=== Tertiary education ===
Kean University, a co-educational, public research university dating back to 1855 is located in Union and Hillside, serving nearly 13,000 undergraduates. Kean University educates its students in the liberal arts, the sciences and the professions; it is best known for its programs in the humanities and social sciences and in education, graduating the most teachers in the state of New Jersey annually, along with a physical therapy program which it holds in conjunction with the University of Medicine and Dentistry of New Jersey.

Union College is the two-year community college for Union County, one of a network of 19 county colleges in New Jersey. Union College was founded in 1933 as Union County College and has campuses in Cranford, Elizabeth, Plainfield and Scotch Plains.

=== School districts ===
Most municipalities have their own public high schools, exceptions being Garwood, whose students attend Arthur L. Johnson High School in Clark; Winfield, whose students attend David Brearley High School in Kenilworth; and Mountainside, whose students attend Governor Livingston High School in Berkeley Heights. Fanwood is mostly merged with Scotch Plains educationally and the two towns have one high school.

The county has the following school districts:

K-12

- Berkeley Heights Public Schools
- Clark Public School District
- Cranford Township Public Schools
- Elizabeth Public Schools
- Hillside Public Schools
- Kenilworth Public Schools
- Linden Public Schools
- New Providence School District
- Plainfield Public School District
- Rahway Public Schools
- Roselle Park School District
- Roselle Public Schools
- Scotch Plains-Fanwood Regional School District
- Springfield Public Schools
- Summit Public Schools
- Union Public School District
- Westfield Public Schools

Elementary (K-8)

- Garwood Public Schools
- Mountainside School District
- Winfield Township School District

The county also has Union County Vocational Technical Schools, which has both full-time magnet programs that students must apply to, and split-time vocational programs.

== Economy ==
The Bureau of Economic Analysis calculated that the county's gross domestic product was $34.4 billion in 2021, which was ranked eighth in the state and was a 2.4% increase from the prior year.

The top employers in 2011, according to the Union County Economic Development Corporation, were:

#	Employer	# of employees
1	Merck & Co.	10,000
2	New England Motor Freight	3,900
3	USI Services Group	3,200
4	Overlook Medical Center	2,961
5	Maher Terminals	1,700
6	Trinitas Hospital	1,674
7	Children's Specialized Hospital	1,440
8	Alcatel-Lucent	1,300
9	ConocoPhillips	1,000

== Transportation ==
The county is served by rail, air, highways and ports.

=== Roads and highways ===
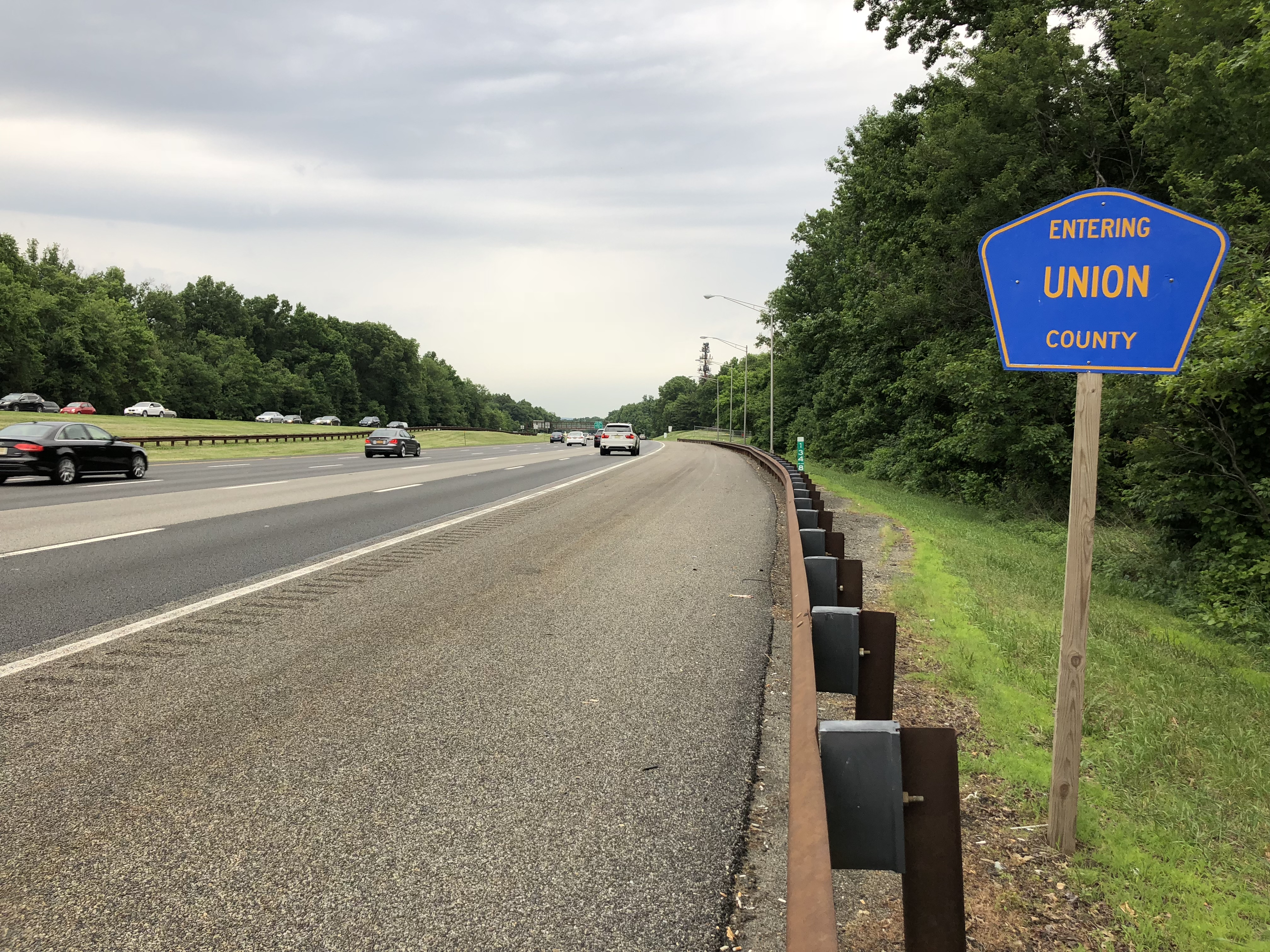
Garden State Parkway northbound entering Union County

As of 2010, the county had a total of 1,418.31 miles (2,282.55 km) of roadways, of which 1,158.45 miles (1,864.34 km) were maintained by the local municipality, 176.32 miles (283.76 km) by Union County and 66.22 miles (106.57 km) by the New Jersey Department of Transportation, 16.22 miles (26.10 km) by the New Jersey Turnpike Authority and 1.10 miles (1.77 km) by the Port Authority of New York and New Jersey.

Major highways which traverse the county include the New Jersey Turnpike (I-95), the Garden State Parkway, I-78, I-278, Route 1/9, Route 22, Route 24, Route 27, Route 28, Route 35 (only in Rahway), Route 82, Route 124, Route 439, and the Goethals Bridge. At 0.15 miles, Route 59, located entirely in Union County, is the shortest state highway in New Jersey.

=== Public transportation ===
Passenger rail service is provide by NJ Transit via the Northeast Corridor, North Jersey Coast Line, Raritan Valley Line, the Morristown Line and the Gladstone Branch. Freight service is provided by on Conrail's Lehigh Line and Chemical Coast Branch. Freight and passenger rail service was provided by the Rahway Valley Railroad from 1897 until 1992 when the short line closed due to lack of customers.

NJ Transit provides bus service to the Port Authority Bus Terminal in Midtown Manhattan, as well as service to major cities in New Jersey and within Union County.

The Port Newark-Elizabeth Marine Terminal is part of the Port Authority of New York and New Jersey.

The southern portion of Newark Liberty International Airport is located in Elizabeth, within Union County.

=== Potential rail-to-trails ===
Union County Park Line rail trail is a proposed walking and/or biking trail proposed on old railroad tracks. Two abandoned rails exist in the county.

The City of Summit and the Summit Park Line Foundation are working on turning the line from Morris Avenue to Briant Park in Summit into a rail trail that will be approximately one mile long. This rail trail, potentially called the Summit Park Line, could provide a greenway to connect several county parks, akin to a Summit High Line. A path could run directly from Summit to the Arthur Kill in Linden, New Jersey on the Rahway Valley Railroad and the Staten Island Rapid Transit line.

The Summit city council applied for a $1 million grant toward the Summit Park Line project in November 2016. "If Summit is able to complete the project, it might help other parts of the greenway come through," said Union County Public Relations Coordinator, Sebastian Delia.

The Rahway Valley Railroad runs from Summit to Roselle Park. Beginning in Hidden Valley Park, the railroad right-of-way continues by connecting Houdaille Quarry, Briant Park, Meisel Park, Rahway River Parkway, Galloping Hill Golf Course and Black Brook Park. The ending of the railway is on Westfield Avenue in Roselle Park. The Staten Island Rapid Transit runs from Cranford to Staten Island, although the project would only include the section that runs from Cranford to Linden. The possible inception in Cranford would be a lot on South Avenue East. The ending of this trail would be in Linden at an empty lot. A boardwalk would run over the existing tracks to ease line reactivation.

== Municipalities ==
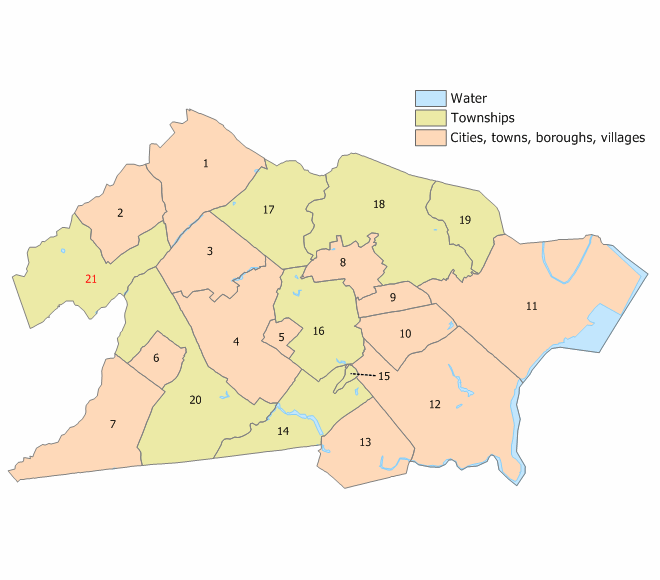
Index map of Union County municipalities (click to see index key)

Interactive map of municipalities in Union County.

The 21 municipalities in Union County (with 2010 Census data for population, housing units and area) are:

Municipality (with map key)	Map key	Municipal type	Population	Housing units	Total area	Water area	Land area	Pop. density	Housing density	School district	Communities
Berkeley Heights	21	township	13,285	4,596	6.27	0.05	6.21	2,122.4	739.9	Berkeley Heights	Murray Hill (part)
Clark	14	township	15,544	5,751	4.49	0.19	4.30	3,430.5	1,337.0	Clark	
Cranford	16	township	23,847	8,816	4.87	0.04	4.83	4,684.6	1,825.4	Cranford Township	Cranford CDP (2,032)
Elizabeth	11	city	137,298	45,516	13.46	1.15	12.32	10,144.1	3,694.7	Elizabeth	
Fanwood	6	borough	7,774	2,686	1.34	0.00	1.34	5,454.1	2,001.9	Scotch Plains-Fanwood	
Garwood	5	borough	4,454	1,870	0.66	0.00	0.66	6,362.7	2,815.5	Clark (9-12) (S/R) Garwood (PK-8)	
Hillside	19	township	22,456	7,536	2.76	0.01	2.75	7,784.0	2,740.6	Hillside	
Kenilworth	8	borough	8,427	2,924	2.16	0.00	2.16	3,668.3	1,355.3	Kenilworth	Kean University CDP (part; 1,522)
Linden	12	city	43,738	15,872	11.41	0.73	10.68	3,793.8	1,486.8	Linden	
Mountainside	3	borough	7,020	2,558	4.05	0.04	4.01	1,668.0	638.3	Berkeley Heights (9-12) (S/R); Mountainside (PK-8)	
New Providence	2	borough	13,650	4,537	3.66	0.02	3.64	3,343.4	1,246.3	New Providence	Murray Hill (part)
Plainfield	7	city	54,586	16,621	6.03	0.01	6.02	8,270.1	2,759.8	Plainfield	
Rahway	13	city	29,556	11,300	4.03	0.13	3.90	7,016.8	2,899.5	Rahway	
Roselle	10	borough	22,695	7,939	2.66	0.01	2.65	7,953.5	2,994.7	Roselle	
Roselle Park	9	borough	13,967	5,231	1.23	0.00	1.23	10,792.7	4,245.8	Roselle Park	
Scotch Plains	20	township	24,968	8,896	9.05	0.03	9.02	2,606.9	986.4	Scotch Plains-Fanwood	
Springfield	17	township	17,178	6,736	5.19	0.02	5.17	3,057.2	1,302.0	Springfield	Springfield CDP (1,518)
Summit	1	city	22,719	8,190	6.05	0.05	6.00	3,578.9	1,366.0	Summit	
Union	18	township	59,728	20,250	9.09	0.02	9.07	6,244.3	2,232.4	Union	Connecticut Farms CDP (545); Kean University CDP (part; 1,522); Union CDP (2,229); Vauxhall CDP (5,251)
Westfield	4	town	31,032	10,950	6.74	0.02	6.72	4,512.2	1,629.8	Westfield	
Winfield	15	township	1,423	714	0.18	0.00	0.18	8,320.1	4,038.5	Kenilworth (9-12) (S/R); Winfield Township (PK-8)	
Union County		county	575,345	199,489	105.40	2.55	102.85	5,216.1	1,939.5		

== Parks and recreation ==
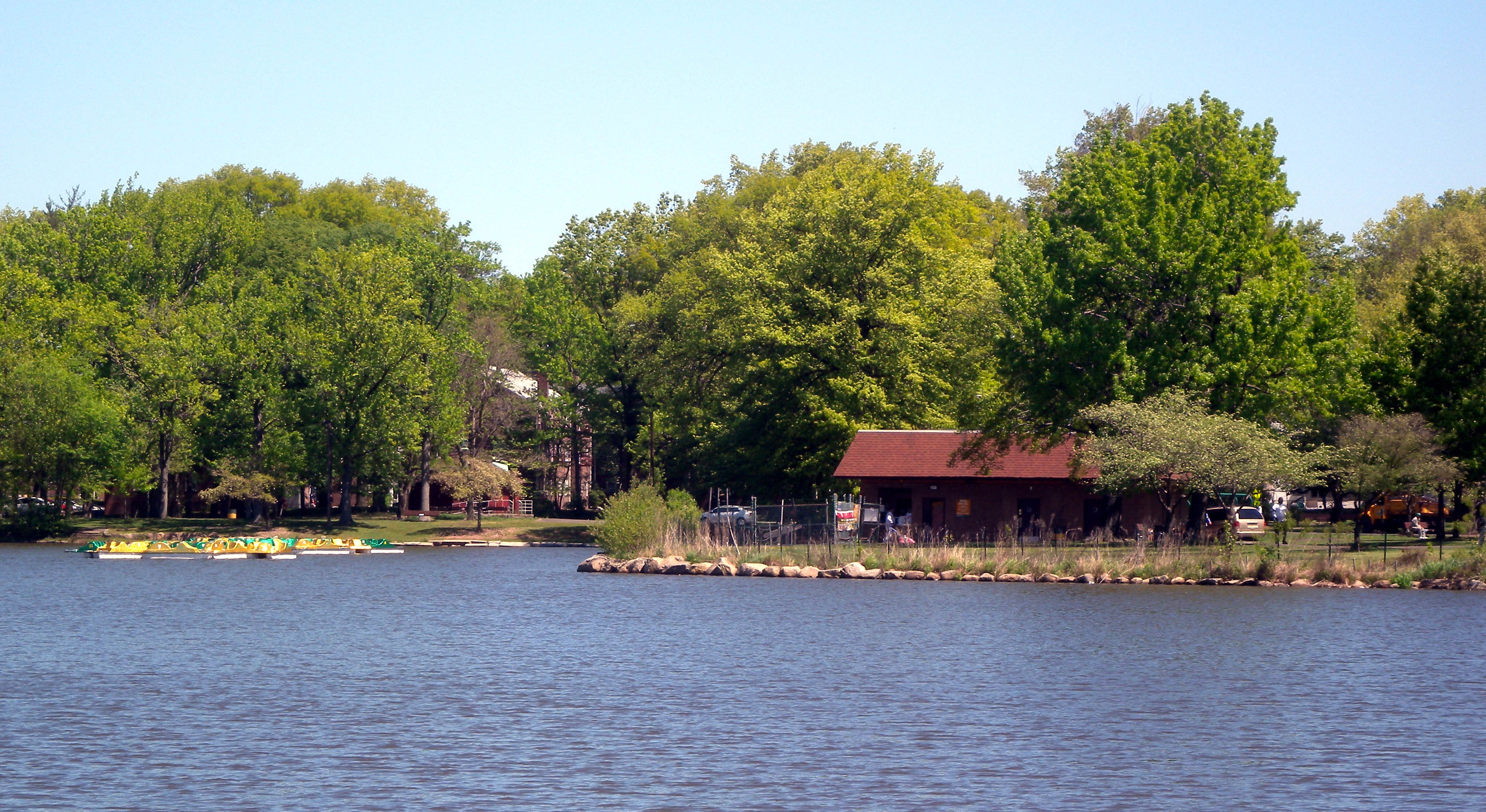
Warinanco Park in Roselle

County parks are maintained and operated by the Union County Department of Parks and Recreation, the successor agency to the Union County Park Commission.

=== County-run parks ===
- Ash Brook Reservation, Scotch Plains
- Black Brook Park, Kenilworth
- Briant Park, Summit
- Brookside Park, Scotch Plains

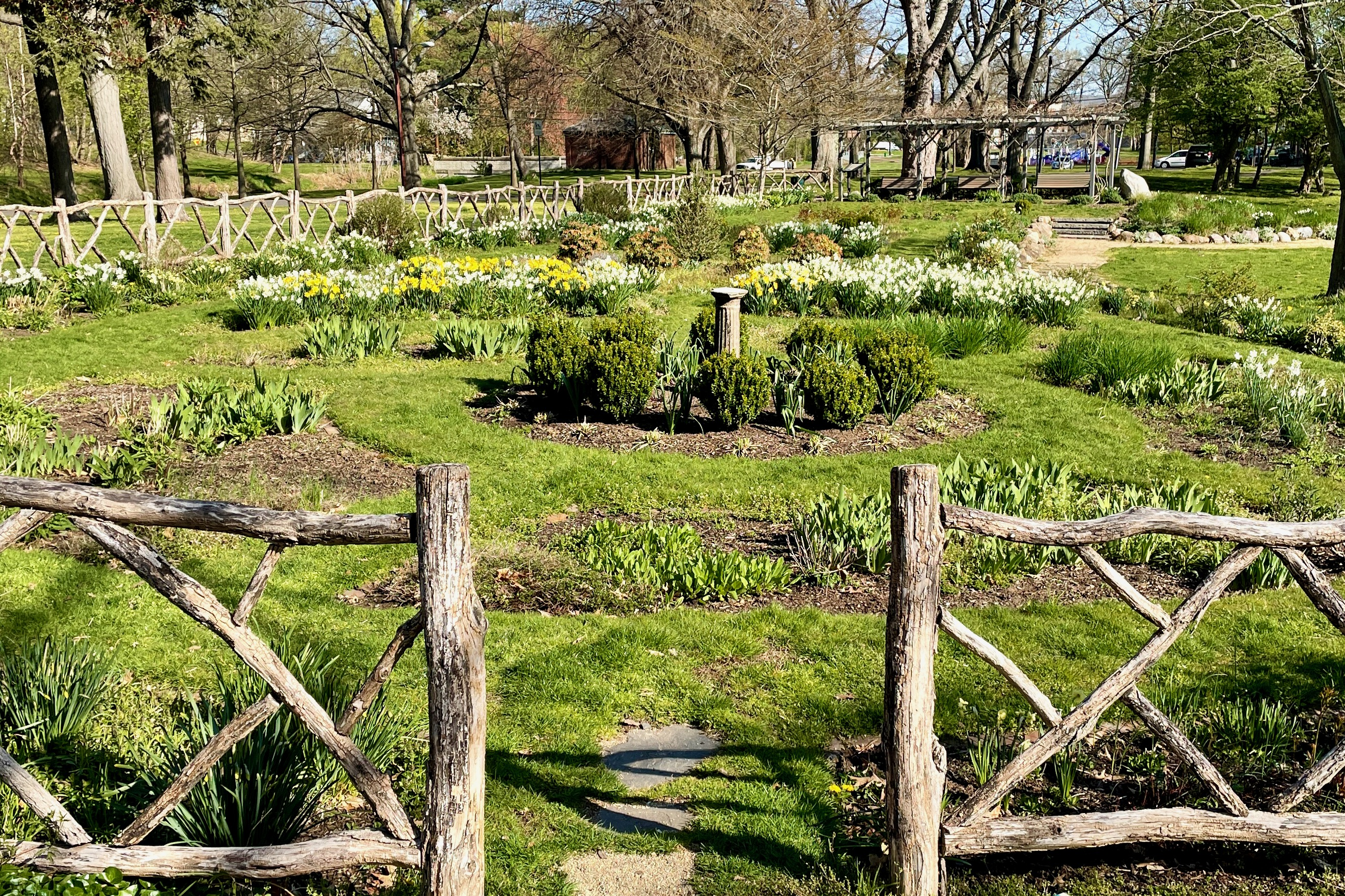
Shakespeare Garden at Cedar Brook Park, Plainfield

- Cedar Brook Park, Plainfield
  - Home to the Shakespeare Garden.
- Echo Lake Park, Westfield and Mountainside
  - The privately owned Echo Lake Country Club donated the parkland for this park in the 1920s. The name arises from the echo heard off the high bluff on the far side of the lake. Echo Lake itself was created by damning when mills were established on Nomahegan Brook, a tributary of the Rahway River. The Great Minisink Trail passed by Echo Lake Park.
- Elizabeth River Parkway
- Esposito Park, Clark
  - Features a 1/2-mile path with exercise equipment and a skate park
- Green Brook Park, Plainfield (partial)
- Hidden Valley Park, Springfield and Summit
  - Eastern border is adjacent to the now-closed Houdaille Quarry.
- Houdaille Quarry, Springfield (closed to public)
- Kawameeh Park, Union
- Lenape Park, Cranford, Westfield, and Kenilworth
  - In the 1930s, workers digging Lenape Lake found mastodon bones here.
- Madison Avenue Park, Rahway
  - Adjacent to Rahway 7th and 8th Grade Academy

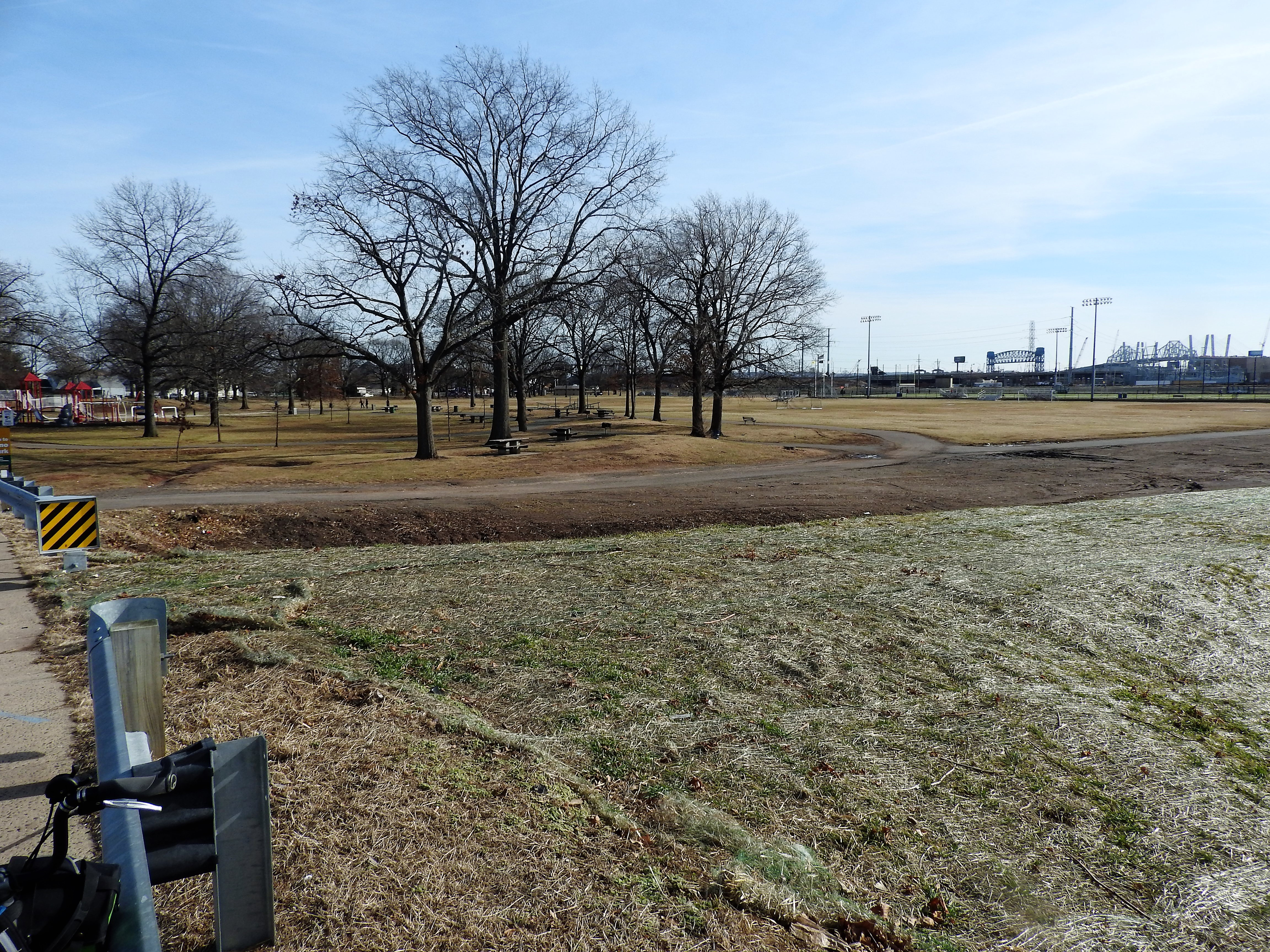
Mattano Park

- Clark Reservoir Recreation Area
- Mattano Park, Elizabeth
  - Named for a Lenape tribal leader, whose name was recorded by colonists as Mattano. In 1664, a group called the Elizabethtown Associates bought land in the Union County area from Mattano and another Lenape leader named Warinanco.
- McConnell Park, Cranford
  - Named for the first town doctor in Cranford
- Milton Lake Park, Clark and Rahway
- Mindowaskin Park, Westfield
- Nomahegan Park, Cranford
  - Contains Nomahegan Park Pond and encircles the Rahway River.
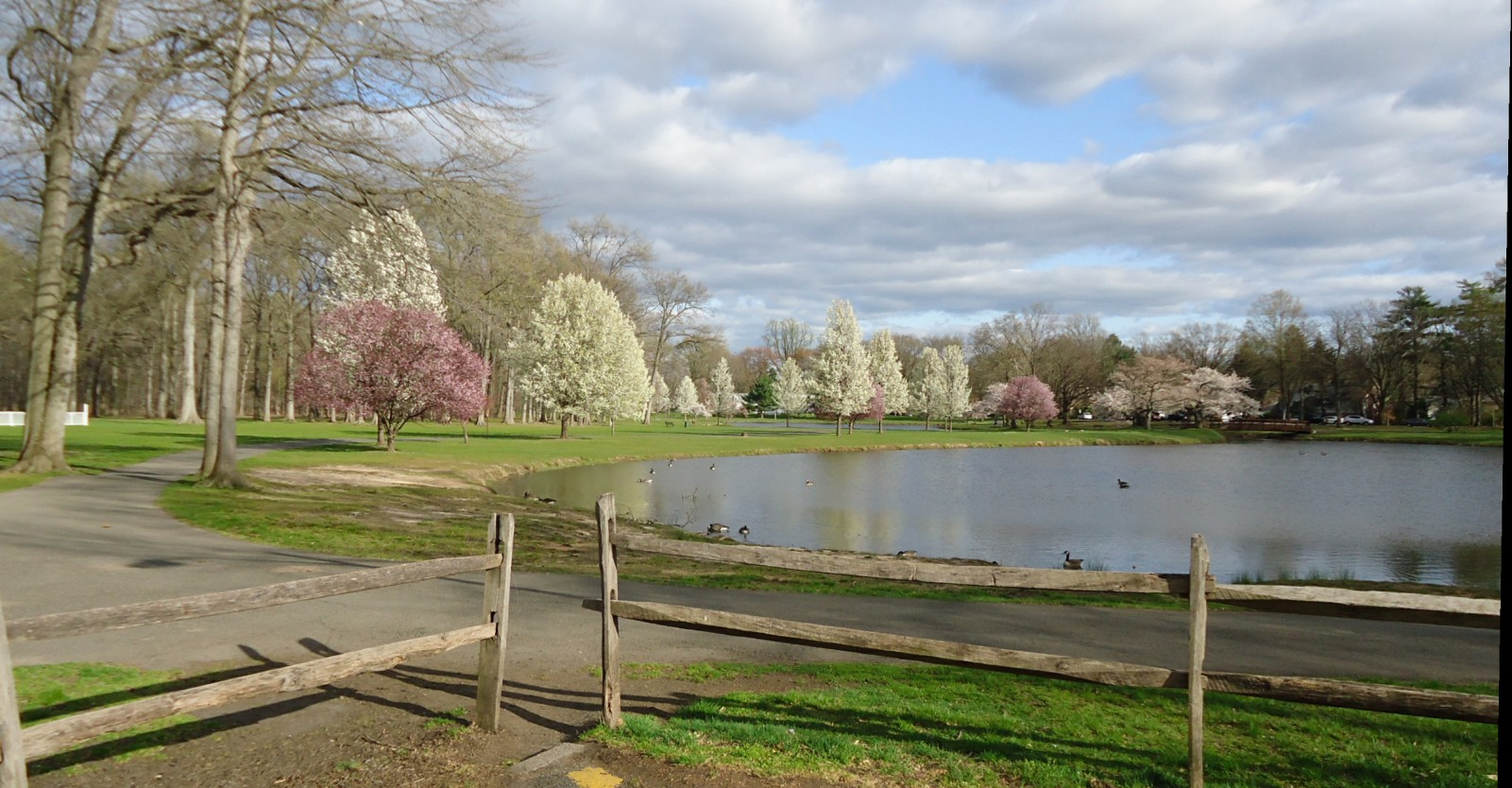
    Nomahegan Pond near Union County College in Cranford
- Oak Ridge Park, Clark
- Passaic River Parkway, Berkeley Heights, New Providence, and Summit
- Phil Rizzuto Park, Elizabeth
- Ponderosa Farm Park, Scotch Plains
- Rahway River Park, Rahway
  - Environmental groups protested at the building of a stadium here in 2016. The movement gave birth to Friends of Rahway River Parkway.
- Rahway River Parkway
- Snyder Avenue Park, Berkeley Heights
- Sperry Park, Cranford
- Stanley Avenue Park, Summit
- Tamaques Park, Scotch Plains
- Unami Park, Cranford, Garwood, and Westfield
- Washington Avenue Park, Springfield
- Watchung Reservation, Mountainside and Scotch Plains
- Warinanco Park, Elizabeth and Roselle
  - Named for the Native American known as "Warinanco." Designed by the Olmsted Brothers firm.
- Wheeler Park, Linden

=== Other notable parks ===
Parks that are not managed by the county government include:

- Hawk Rise Sanctuary. A bird sanctuary was built in 2012 on the banks of Rahway River in Linden. Hawk Rise Sanctuary is a 95-acre ecological preserve and wetland complex in Linden in an area previously concealed by various industrial land uses. Its trails were created adjacent to the former Linden Landfill area by the New Jersey Department of Environmental Protection, the city of Linden and the New Jersey Audubon Society. The trails in the Hawk Rise forest are boardwalk, with some continuing as gravel along the edge of the former Linden Landfill. It has an overlook area where hikers can view the Rahway River and nearby marshes. It has been open to the public since 2012. The site includes diverse environments: forested wetlands, vernal pools, grasslands, shrublands, salt marsh, mudflats, a pond, and the tidal Rahway River. 163 bird species have been spotted there. It has been reported as vandalized.
- Reeves-Reed Arboretum in Summit.
- Kennedy Reservation in Union.
- The grounds of Liberty Hall Museum near the campus of Kean University in Union and Elizabeth.

=== Rahway River Parkway ===
The Rahway River Parkway is a greenway of parkland that hugs the Rahway River and its tributaries, such as Nomahegan Brook. It was the inaugural project of the Union County Parks Commission designed in the 1920s by the Olmsted Brothers firm, who were the sons of landscape architect Frederick Law Olmsted. Several county and municipal parks run along the Rahway River.

=== Elizabeth River Parkway ===
The Elizabeth River Parkway is a greenway of parkland alongside the Elizabeth River and its tributaries. It runs through Kean University and Liberty Hall Museum on the river's way to the Arthur Kill. The Elizabeth River Parkway is broken down into separate sections.

- Chatfield/Zimmerman - Hillside and Union Township
- Lightning Brook - Hillside and Union
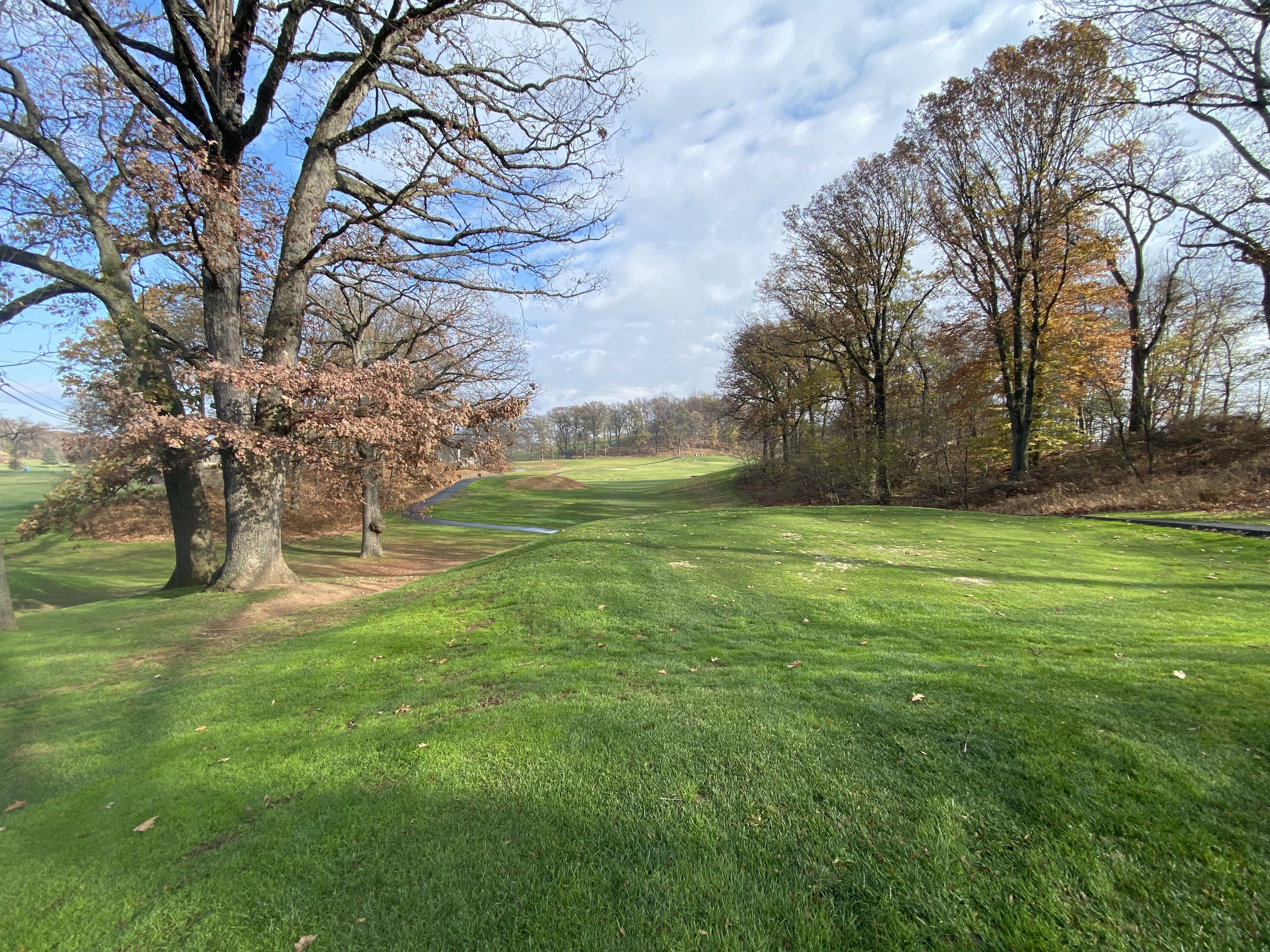
- Galloping Hill Golf Course in November 2022
  Pruden/Pearl Oval - Elizabeth
- Salem/Rutgers/Liberty - Hillside and Union
- Woodruff/Conant Street - Hillside and Union
- Ursino - Hillside and Union Township

=== Public golf courses ===
Union County's Division of Golf Operations runs two golf courses, which offer golf lessons and practice areas.

- Ash Brook Golf Course in Scotch Plains.
- Galloping Hill Golf Course and Golf Learning Center in Kenilworth. The facility, which hosts the headquarters of the New Jersey State Golf Association, hosted the 2016 New Jersey State Open golf tournament, the first public golf course to host the tournament since it was established in 1921.

Another notable course

- Shady Rest Country Club in Scotch Plains is recognized as the first African-American owned and operated golf clubhouse in the United States. As such, Shady Rest is the home course of the first African-American golf professional to play in the U.S. Open, John Matthew Shippen, Jr. (1879-1968), who is considered a pioneer of the sport. Originally a private club and center for African-American social life, the township acquired and renamed it in the 1930s as the 'Scotch Hills Country Club' and made it open to the public. The history and significance of the course and clubhouse has not always been promoted as a place of national historic interest. Thankfully, the National Park Service has listed the Shady Rest Golf and Country Club (_100007869) in the National Registry of Historic Places, in large part due to the efforts of the Preserve Shady Rest Committee. The committee continues working to further solidify Shady Rest as a local, state, and national landmark given its historical significance.

=== Private golf courses ===
- Baltusrol Golf Club is a private 36-hole golf club in Springfield founded in 1895 by Louis Keller. Both courses were originally designed by A. W. Tillinghast in 1918. The club has hosted seven U.S. Opens and the 2005 and 2016 PGA Championships.
- Echo Lake Country Club is a private, member-owned country club located in Westfield, founded in 1899. The 18-hole golf course was designed by Donald Ross in 1913.
- Hyatt Hills Golf Complex in Clark
- Shackamaxon Country Club
- Suburban Golf Club

=== Other recreational facilities ===
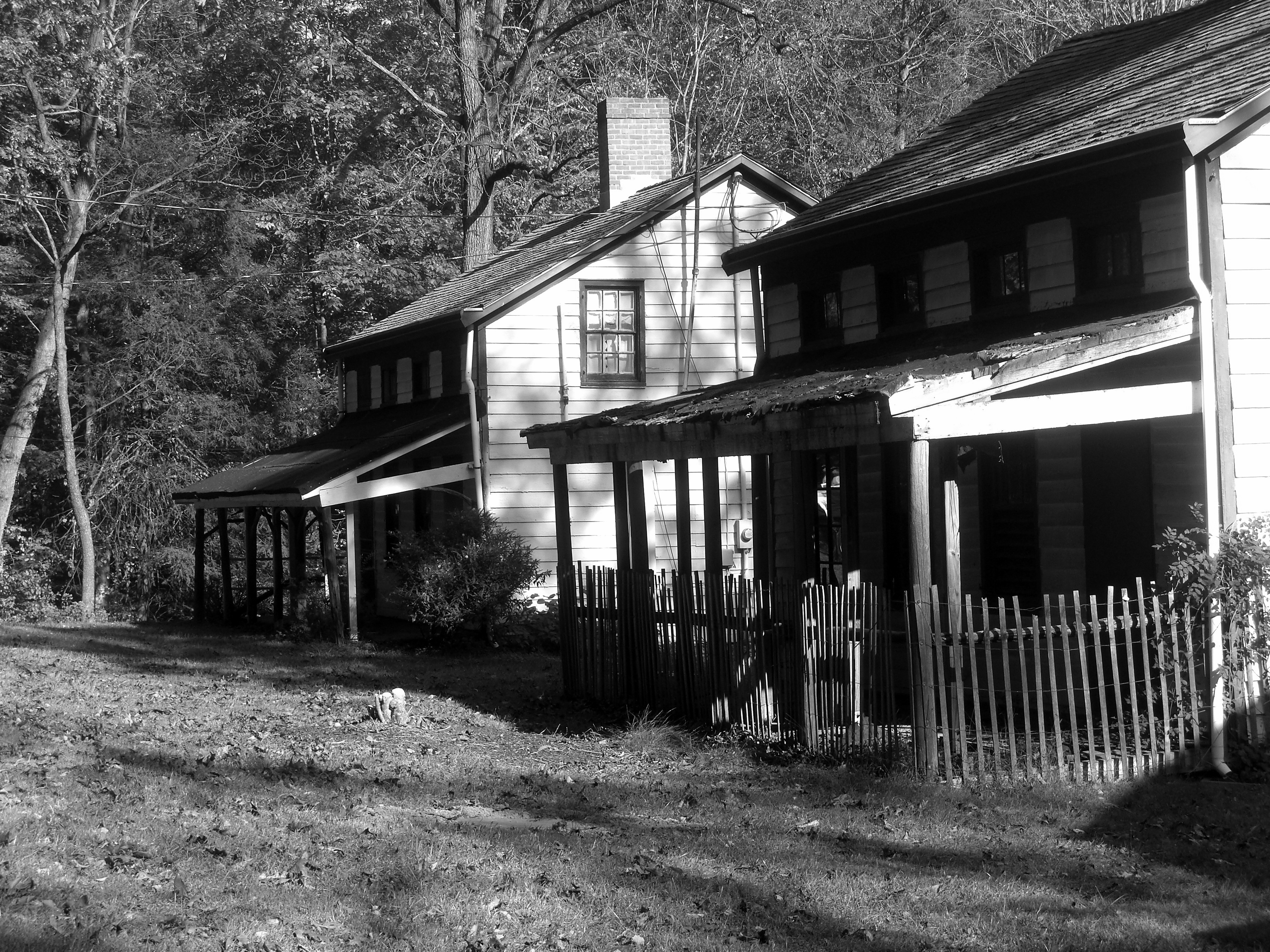
Deserted Village of Feltville

- Clark Community Pool
- Centennial Avenue Pool in Cranford, NJ
- Oak Ridge Archery Range
- Orange Avenue Pool in Cranford, NJ
- Trailside Nature and Science Center at Watchung Reservation
- Warinanco Ice Skating Rink
- Wheeler Park
- Westfield Memorial Pool
- Spray Pool – Wheeler Park (Linden)
- County Pool – Rahway River Park (Rahway)

== Arts and culture ==
- The Union County Performing Arts Center, located in the Rahway Arts District, offers professional productions in music and theater as well as training in the performing arts.
- Kean Stage is the professional performing arts arm of Kean University. It is home to Wilkins Theatre on the Kean Main Campus in Union, Enlow Recital Hall directly across the Elizabeth River in East Campus in Hillside, as well as Premiere Stages, the professional equity theater company in residence at Kean University.
- The Cranford Dramatic Club is New Jersey's oldest continually producing theater and has been putting on theatrical productions since its establishment in 1919.
- Tomasulo Art Gallery is in the MacKay Library at Union County College's Cranford campus.
- The Wharton Institute for the Performing Arts, located in Berkeley Heights and New Providence, is a center for music training and other training in performing arts, particularly aimed at children. It consists of the Performing Arts School (formerly Wharton Music Center), New Jersey Youth Symphony, and Paterson Music Project.
- The Plainfield Symphony Orchestra was founded in 1919, making it the state's oldest community orchestra.
- The duCret School of Art in Plainfield was founded in 1926.
- The Swain Gallery, in Plainfield, was founded in 1868 and is the oldest privately owned art gallery in the state.

=== Union County Historical Society ===
In 1869, the Union County Historical Society of New Jersey was incorporated. The society meets at the Hanson House in Cranford.

=== Municipal historical societies ===
- Berkeley Heights - The Berkeley Heights Historical Society.
- Clark - The Clark Historical Society was founded in 1970. It operates the Dr. William Robinson Plantation House Museum, built in 1690 by a doctor from Scotland.
- Cranford - The Cranford Historic Preservation Advisory Board is an official township committee body, while the Cranford Historical Society itself is citizen-run. It is located in the Hanson House in Hanson Park on Springfield Avenue and maintains the Crane-Phillips House (c. 1845) a couple of blocks south on North Union Avenue as a museum.
- Garwood - Garwood Historical Committee.
- Hillside - The Hillside Historical Society, founded in 1975, meets at the Woodruff House.
- Kenilworth - The Kenilworth Historical Society dates to 1974. It runs the Oswald J. Nitschke House (c. 1880).
- Linden - The Linden Society for Historical Preservation is an offshoot of an official cultural board in the city.
- Mountainside - The Mountainside Restoration Committee, Inc. is also called the Mountainside Historic Committee, founded in 1984.
- Plainfield - The Historical Society of Plainfield is headquartered at the Nathaniel Drake House Museum, built in 1746 on the Old York Road.
- Rahway - The Rahway Historical Society is now called the Merchants' and Drovers' Tavern Museum Association.
- Scotch Plains and Fanwood - The Scotch Plains-Fanwood Historical Society runs the Osborn Cannonball House.
- Springfield - The Historic Cannon Ball House serves as the home of the Springfield Historical Society.
- Summit - The Summit Historical Society, founded in 1929, is housed within The Carter House, which is thought to be the oldest extant building in Summit.
- Westfield - The Westfield Historical Society is in the Reeve History & Cultural Resource Center, a structure from the 1870s. The Society also runs the Miller-Cory House Museum, in a home that dates back to the 1740s.
- Union - Union Township Historical Society is located in the 1782 historic Caldwell Parsonage. The Society's mission is to preserve and promote the rich and diverse history of the Township of Union.

=== Other historical preservation groups ===
- Friends of Rahway River Parkway is dedicated to preserving Olmsted design principles and features of county parkland along the Rahway River as it flows to the Arthur Kill.

=== Sister city ===
The county has a sister city relationship with Wenzhou in Zhejiang, China.

== See also ==
- National Register of Historic Places listings in Union County, New Jersey
