= Kenilworth Public Schools =

School district in Union County, New Jersey, US

Address
- 426 Boulevard Kenilworth, Union County, New Jersey, 07033; United States
- Coordinates: 40.6761°N 74.2954°W

District information
- Grades: PreK-12
- Superintendent: Jeremy Davies
- Business administrator: Jessica Alves
- Schools: 3

Students and staff
- Enrollment: 1,451 (as of 2024–25)
- Faculty: 133.3 FTEs
- Student–teacher ratio: 10.9:1

Other information
- District Factor Group: DE
- Website: www.kenilworthschools.com
Ind.	Per pupil	District spending	Rank (*)	K-12 average	%± vs. average
1A	Total Spending	$17,375	20	$18,891	−8.0%
1	Budgetary Cost	13,535	22	14,783	−8.4%
2	Classroom Instruction	8,489	28	8,763	−3.1%
6	Support Services	1,844	14	2,392	−22.9%
8	Administrative Cost	1,400	7	1,485	−5.7%
10	Operations & Maintenance	1,333	9	1,783	−25.2%
13	Extracurricular Activities	443	29	268	65.3%
16	Median Teacher Salary	65,218	38	64,043
Data from NJDoE 2014 Taxpayers' Guide to Education Spending. *Of K-12 districts with up to 1,800 students. Lowest spending=1; Highest=49

The Kenilworth Public Schools is a comprehensive community public school district that serves students in pre-kindergarten through twelfth grade from the borough of Kenilworth, in Union County, in the U.S. state of New Jersey.

As of the 2024–25 school year, the district, comprised of two schools, had an enrollment of 1,451 students and 133.3 classroom teachers (on an FTE basis), for a student–teacher ratio of 10.9:1.

Students from Winfield Township attend David Brearley High School as part of a sending/receiving relationship with the Winfield Township School District.

The district participates in the Interdistrict Public School Choice Program at David Brearley High School, having been approved on November 2, 1999, as one of the first ten districts statewide to participate in the program. Available slots are announced annually by grade. Each school year, slots are made available by grade and a lottery is used to select attendees if there are more applicants than available slots. Prospective Choice participants must be residents of Union County eligible for placement in grades 7-10 who were enrolled in a public school during the full year prior to entry to the Kenilworth Public Schools.

The district had been classified by the New Jersey Department of Education as being in District Factor Group "DE", the fifth-highest of eight groupings. District Factor Groups organize districts statewide to allow comparison by common socioeconomic characteristics of the local districts. From lowest socioeconomic status to highest, the categories are A, B, CD, DE, FG, GH, I and J.

== Schools ==
Schools in the district (with 2024–25 enrollment data from the National Center for Education Statistics) are:

Elementary school

- Warren G. Harding Elementary School with 659 students in grades PreK–5
  - Ronald Bubnowski, principal

Middle school

- David Brearley Middle School for grades 6–8
  - Madelyn Pavelchak, principal

High school

- David Brearley High School for grades 9–12. The middle school and high school had a combined enrollment of 774 students.
  - Vincent Cuccaro, principal

== Administration ==
Core members of the district's administration are:

- Jeremy Davies, superintendent of schools
- Jessica Alves, business administrator and board secretary

Former superintendent Thomas Tramaglini resigned from his position effective September 2018, after he had been arrested for an incident in which he had been charged with defecating at the athletic fields at Holmdel High School. Marilyn Birnbaum was hired to serve as superintendent, acting on an interim basis until Kyle Arlington took over on a permanent basis in February 2019.

== Board of education ==
The district's board of education, comprised of nine members, sets policy and oversees the fiscal and educational operation of the district through its administration. As a Type II school district, the board's trustees are elected directly by voters to serve three-year terms of office on a staggered basis, with three seats up for election each year held (since 2012) as part of the November general election. The board appoints a superintendent to oversee the district's day-to-day operations and a business administrator to supervise the business functions of the district.
