= Cedar Brook Park =

- U.S. National Register of Historic Places
- U.S. Historic district
- New Jersey Register of Historic Places
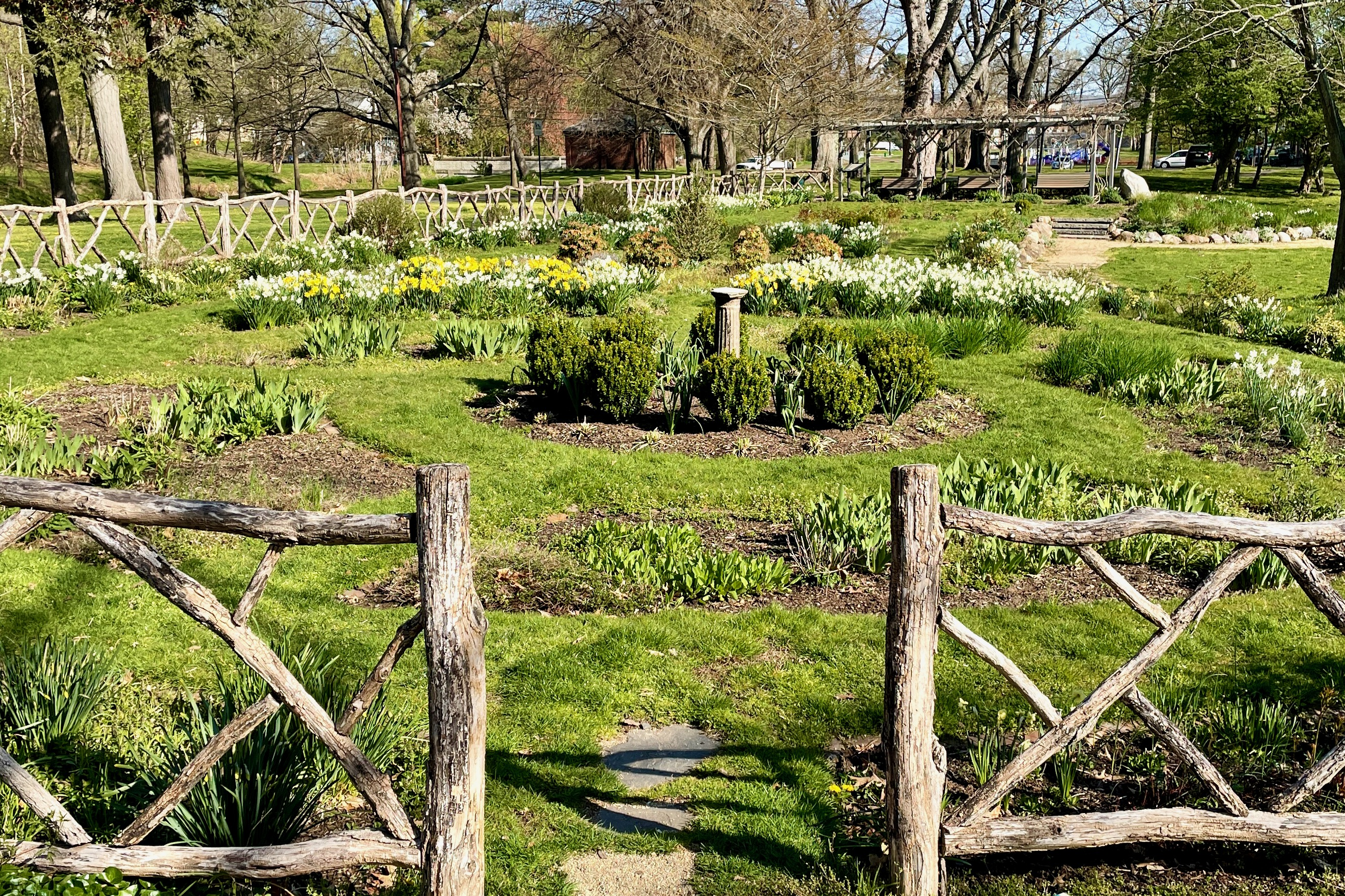
- Shakespeare Garden

- Location within Union County, New Jersey Location within Middlesex County, New Jersey Location within New Jersey Location within the United States
- Location: Roughly bounded Steel Ave., Arlington Ave., Park Ave., Rose St. and Laramie Rd., Kenyon Ave., Parkside Rd. Plainfield and South Plainfield, New Jersey, U.S.
- Coordinates: 40°36′5″N 74°24′25″W
- Area: 78 acres (32 ha)
- Built: 1930
- Architect: Olmsted Brothers
- NRHP reference No.: 07000878
- NJRHP No.: 4718

Significant dates
- Added to NRHP: August 28, 2007
- Designated NJRHP: June 25, 2007

Cedar Brook Park is a 78-acre (32 ha) county park situated mostly in Plainfield in Union County, within the U.S. state of New Jersey, with a smaller portion of the park extending into South Plainfield in adjacent Middlesex County. Featuring the Shakespeare Garden, it was listed on the National Register of Historic Places on June 25, 2007, for its significance in landscape architecture. The park was designed by the Olmsted Brothers of Brookline, Massachusetts from 1924 to 1930.

== History and description ==
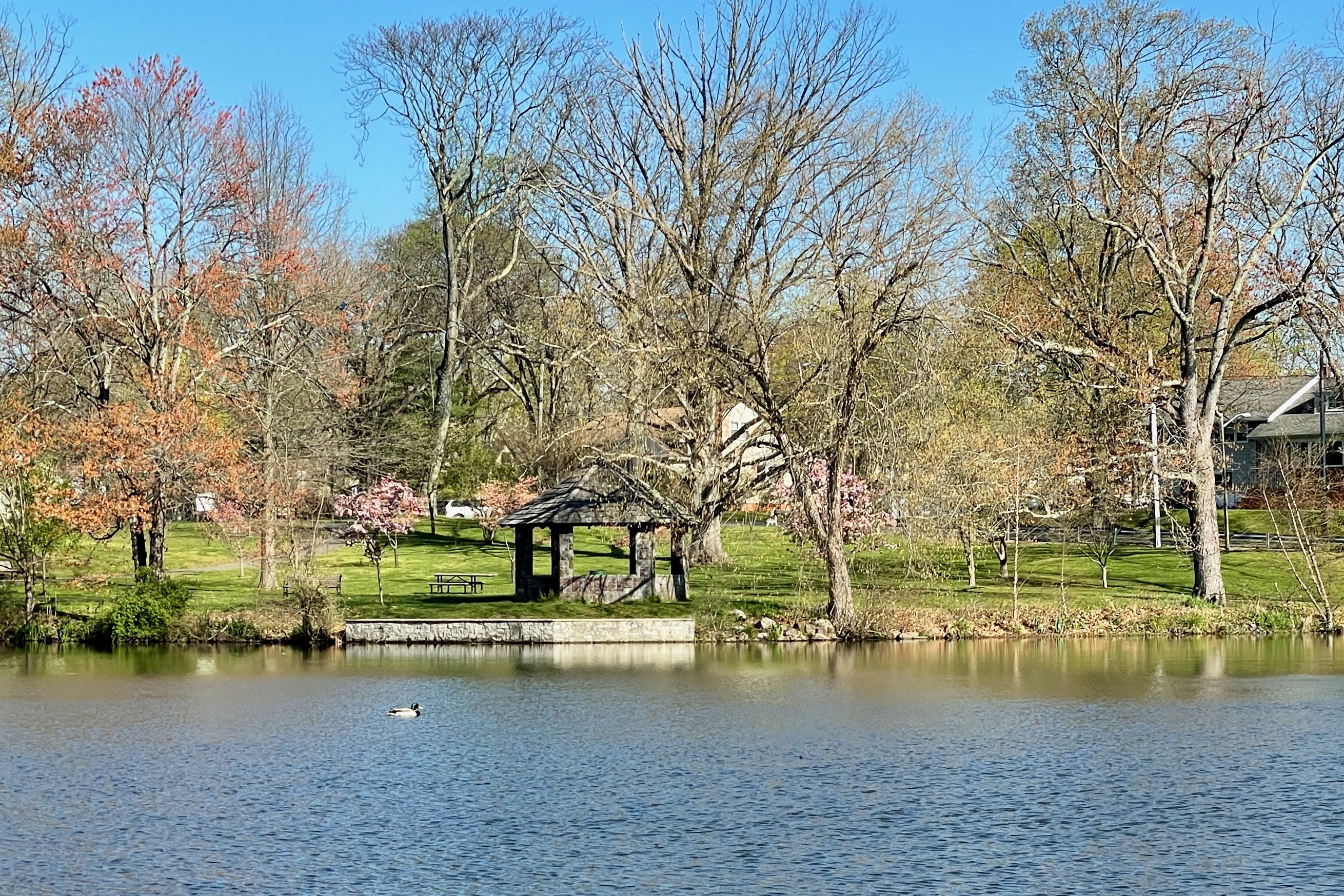
Cedar Brook Park Lake and walking path

In 1921, the Union County Park Commission was established and hired the Olmsted Brothers, formed by the sons of landscape architect Frederick Law Olmsted, to design a county park system. The firm developed a preliminary plan for Cedar Brook Park in 1924, with work on the land and gardens completed by 1930. It is the third Olmsted Brothers designed park out of the 26 within the Union County Park System. The Shakespeare Garden is a formally designed area that originally contained plantings specifically named in Shakespeare’s works. It is maintained by the Plainfield Garden Club, with support from the New Jersey Historic Trust. A walking path connects the various features of the park, including the garden and the man-made lake on the Cedar Brook.

== Tëmike Park Playground controversy ==
In 2022, controversy erupted over negative comments made about the opening of Tëmike Park, an LGBTQ-inclusive playground, in the park.

== See also ==
- National Register of Historic Places listings in Union County, New Jersey
- National Register of Historic Places listings in Middlesex County, New Jersey
- New Jersey Women's Heritage Trail
