= Mike Chalenski =

American football player (born 1970)

No. 71, 70, 95
- Positions: Defensive end, defensive tackle

Personal information
- Born: January 28, 1970 (age 56); Elizabeth, New Jersey, U.S.
- Listed height: 6 ft 5 in (1.96 m)
- Listed weight: 280 lb (127 kg)

Career information
- High school: Brearley (Kenilworth, New Jersey)
- College: UCLA
- NFL draft: 1993: undrafted

Career history
- Philadelphia Eagles (1993–1995); New York Jets (1996); Minnesota Vikings (1997)*; Miami Dolphins (1997); Detroit Lions (1998)
- * Offseason or practice squad member only

Awards and highlights
- Second-team All-Pac-10 (1991)

Career NFL statistics
- Tackles: 43
- Fumble recoveries: 1
- Sacks: 0.5
- Stats at Pro Football Reference

Michael Alan Chalenski (born January 28, 1970) is an American former professional football player who was a defensive lineman for six seasons in the National Football League (NFL) with the Philadelphia Eagles, the New York Jets, the Miami Dolphins, and the Detroit Lions. He played college football for the UCLA Bruins.

Raised in Kenilworth, New Jersey, Chalenski played prep football at David Brearley High School.
