= Winfield Township School District =

School district in Union County, New Jersey, US

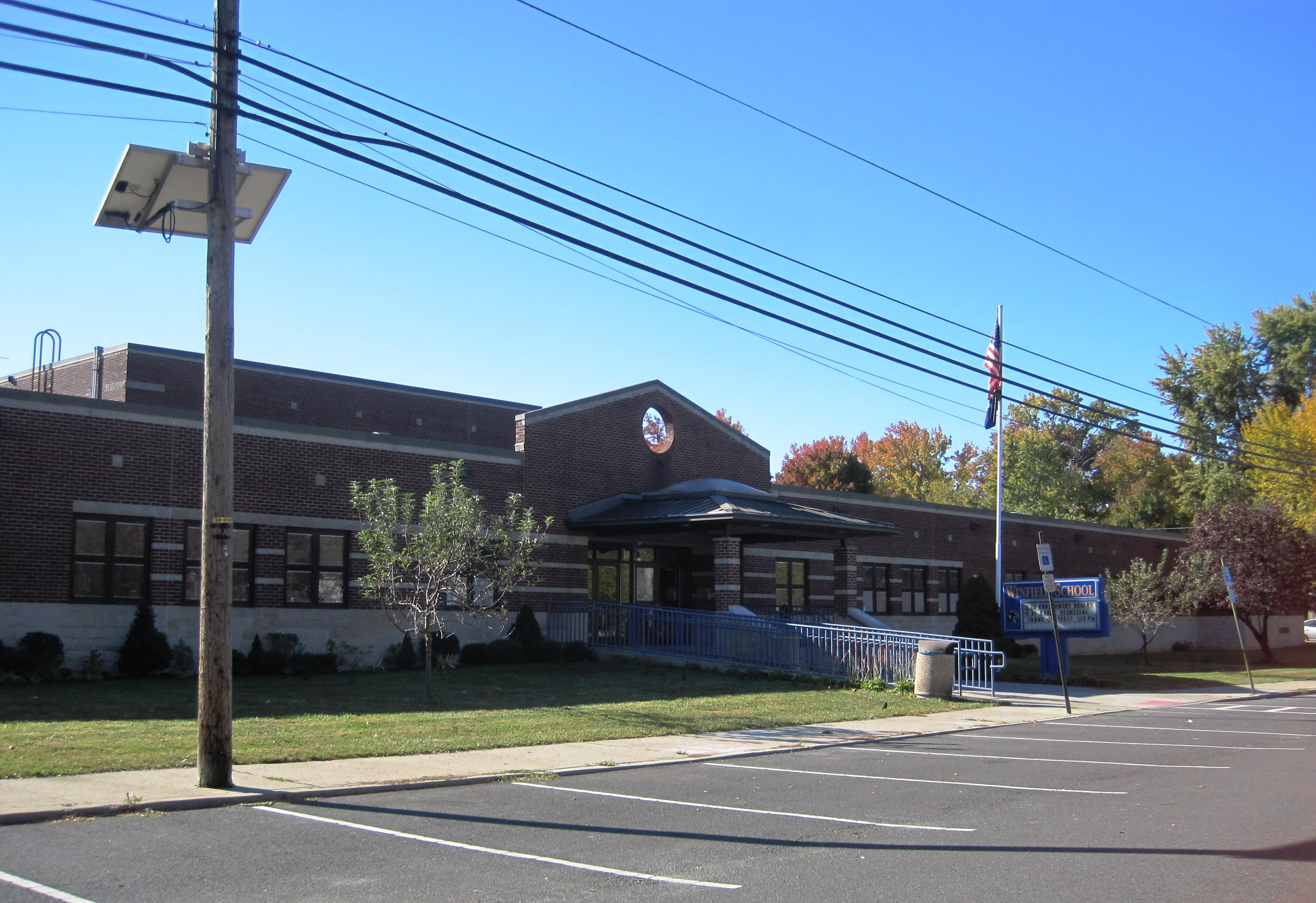
- Front of Winfield School, the only school in the district

Address
- 7 1/2 Gulfstream Avenue Winfield Township, Union County, New Jersey, 07036; United States
- Coordinates: 40.631995°N 74.255204°W

District information
- Grades: PreK to 8
- Superintendent: Ross LeBrun
- Business administrator: Danielle Tarvin
- Schools: 1

Students and staff
- Enrollment: 147 (as of 2023–24)
- Faculty: 17.1 FTEs
- Student–teacher ratio: 8.6:1

Other information
- District Factor Group: B
- Website: www.winfieldschool.org
Ind.	Per pupil	District spending	Rank (*)	K-8 average	%± vs. average
1A	Total Spending	$17,964	33	$18,891	−4.9%
1	Budgetary Cost	15,206	36	14,159	7.4%
2	Classroom Instruction	9,505	42	8,659	9.8%
6	Support Services	2,248	28	2,167	3.7%
8	Administrative Cost	1,428	13	1,547	−7.7%
10	Operations & Maintenance	1,856	42	1,612	15.1%
13	Extracurricular Activities	170	41	104	63.5%
16	Median Teacher Salary	59,046	40	61,136
Data from NJDoE 2014 Taxpayers' Guide to Education Spending. *Of K-8 districts with up to 400 students. Lowest spending=1; Highest=71

The Winfield Township School District is a community public school district that serves students in pre-Kindergarten to eighth grade from Winfield Township in Union County, in the U.S. state of New Jersey.

As of the 2023–24 school year, the district, comprised of one school, had an enrollment of 147 students and 17.1 classroom teachers (on an FTE basis), for a student–teacher ratio of 8.6:1. In the 2016–17 school year, Winfield had the 19th-smallest enrollment of any school district in the state, with 140 students.

Public school students in ninth through twelfth grades attend David Brearley High School in Kenilworth, as part of a sending/receiving relationship with the Kenilworth Public Schools. As of the 2023–24 school year, the high school had an enrollment of 778 students and 72.3 classroom teachers (on an FTE basis), for a student–teacher ratio of 10.8:1.

== History ==
Before the current sending relationship had been established with the Kenilworth Public Schools for township students to attend Brearley, students had attended Rahway High School until a decision by the New Jersey Department of Education in March 2000 allowed for termination of the relationship.

The district had been classified by the New Jersey Department of Education as being in District Factor Group "B", the second-lowest of eight groupings. District Factor Groups organize districts statewide to allow comparison by common socioeconomic characteristics of the local districts. From lowest socioeconomic status to highest, the categories are A, B, CD, DE, FG, GH, I and J.

== School ==
Winfield School serves students in pre-kindergarten through eighth grade, including classes for students with special needs. The school had 146 students enrolled as of the 2023–24 school year.

The Winfield School fields both boys and girls sports teams. Sports offered include soccer, basketball, street hockey (sponsored by the New Jersey Devils), and baseball / softball. In 2006, the boys' basketball team was undefeated. In 2007, both the girls and boys' basketball teams were undefeated, the first time in Winfield history both teams were undefeated in the same year.

== Administration ==
Core members of the district's administration are:

- Ross LeBrun, superintendent and principal
- Danielle Tarvin, business administrator and board secretary

== Board of education ==
The district's board of education, comprised of nine members, sets policy and oversees the fiscal and educational operation of the district through its administration. As a Type II school district, the board's trustees are elected directly by voters to serve three-year terms of office on a staggered basis, with three seats up for election each year held (since 2012) as part of the November general election. The board appoints a superintendent to oversee the district's day-to-day operations and a business administrator to supervise the business functions of the district.
