= Angelo Mongiovi =

Angelo Mongiovi (born June 29, 1952) is a former wheelchair track, basketball, and rugby competitor who was inducted into the United States Quad Rugby Association (USQRA) Hall of Fame in 2002.

== Background ==
Mongiovi was born in Newark, New Jersey, the first of six children. As a child, he eagerly played in the streets with neighborhood children, but he contracted polio just months before Jonas Salk introduced the polio vaccine. He was sent to a school for children with physical and mental handicaps until his family moved as he was entering sixth grade. In Clark, New Jersey, he was mainstreamed into the general education setting, where he thrived, quickly catching up to his peers. While in Clark, he also tried baseball and basketball for the first time. Mongiovi graduated from David Brearley High School in 1970.

In 173, during his senior year at New Jersey Institute of Technology, Mongiovi was working late on a school project and eating in the campus cafeteria when he was approached by Jimmy Marzanno, a double amputee, visiting NCE. Marzanno asked him whether he had ever heard of wheelchair sports; he had not. Marzanno invited Mongiovi to check out a wheelchair basketball practice at Montclair State University. On October 5, 1973, Mongiovi, accompanied by his also-disabled friend Thomas McDonald, was first exposed to the world of wheelchair sports.

After borrowing a wheelchair from another friend, the two traveled to Montclair and had their first experience of wheelchair sports. Both would later go on to achieve high honors in their sports of choice: Mongiovi in rugby, basketball and track, and McDonald in weight lifting. At their first practice, Mongiovi was approached by Michael Lione, a player for the New Jersey Blue Devils Wheelchair Basketball Team (and former classmate at the Branch Brook School) and was invited to try out for the team.

== Basketball ==
Although he had very little experience at maneuvering a wheelchair, Mongiovi had a natural talent for wheelchair sports. After seeing his speed on the basketball court, a woman recruiting for the wheelchair track team invited him to try out.

In 1989 Mongiovi was chosen to represent the United States in the Stoke Mandeville Wheelchair Games, an international wheelchair sports competition. The United States basketball team came in second place that year, losing to the Canadian team.

== Track and field ==
During his career competing nationally and internationally in wheelchair track and field competitions, Mongiovi participated in many events, including the 100 yard dash, 220 and 440 yard, 200 meter, and slalom races. In 1985, he participated in a national competition racing in the 200 meter dash and setting the national record for fastest time in that race. Upon setting his record, Mongiovi was invited to represent the United States once again in the Stoke Mandeville Games, this time for track, where he competed on a track that was once shared with "the fastest man alive," Carl Lewis. He won silver and bronze medals in all of his races at this competition. In 1990, Mongiovi was presented with a national track and field award. He was named the most outstanding slalom competitor overall, beating out one of the best slalom players in the country and one of his role models, Randy Snow.

== Rugby ==
Mongiovi was introduced to wheelchair rugby at the 1989 Stoke Mandeville Wheelchair Games. It was not until the end of the season in 1991, however, that he was recruited by Angelo Nicosia, an EPVA Coach, and Peter Zarba, a player on the team, to come out and play. He tried out and played his first season between 1991 and 1992 at 39 years of age. It was evident even at the beginning that he possessed a natural talent, which may have been contributed to by his previous wheelchair athletic experience. Mongiovi soon began winning awards, and gained sponsorship from Sunrise Medical, manufacturer of the Quickie wheelchair line, during his first season of play.

In 1992, his rugby team, the New York Strykers, competed in the national championships in San Jose, CA where they achieved sixth place and, despite this, Mongiovi was named the Most Valuable Player during his rookie season for the United States.

Sports 'n Spokes, a publication about wheelchair athletics, featured a photo of Mongiovi on its cover in 1993 and referred to "the marvelous play of Mongiovi" in an article about his team.

In 1994, he was asked for the third time to represent the United States in the Stoke Mandeville Games, this time as a rugby player. The U.S. team went on to win the gold medal against Great Britain in the championship game with a score of 27–23. His 1995 season was his last year of international competition in wheelchair sports. Mongiovi was selected to represent the United States in the first ever Wheelchair Rugby World Championship in Notwil, Switzerland in 1995. He was selected by his teammates as one of their co-captains, and went on to win the world championship against Canada and earn the first ever wheelchair rugby international gold medal. See the championship game here: https://m.youtube.com/watch?v=Vsev1RZVJ0g beginning at the 7:00 mark.

Mongiovi retired from quad sports in 2000.

== Personal life ==
Mongiovi met Fiona De Louw, a referee from the Netherlands, at the 1995 Wheelchair Rugby World Championships. They later married.

He has been a resident of Scotch Plains, New Jersey.
