= Connecticut Farms, New Jersey =

Populated place in Union County, New Jersey, US

- Census-designated place
- Location in Union County Location in New Jersey Location in the United States
- Coordinates: 40°41′34″N 74°16′17″W
- Country: United States
- State: New Jersey
- County: Union
- Township: Union

Area
  - Total: 0.093 sq mi (0.24 km^{2})
  - Land: 0.093 sq mi (0.24 km^{2})
  - Water: 0 sq mi (0.00 km^{2})
- Elevation: 102 ft (31 m)

Population (2020)
  - Total: 545
  - Density: 5,950/sq mi (2,297.4/km^{2})
- Time zone: UTC−05:00 (Eastern (EST))
  - Summer (DST): UTC−04:00 (EDT)
- ZIP Code: 07083 (Union)
- Area code: 908
- FIPS code: 34-14815
- GNIS feature ID: 2806063

Connecticut Farms is a neighborhood and census-designated place (CDP) within Union Township, Union County, in the U.S. state of New Jersey. As of the 2020 census, Connecticut Farms had a population of 545.

Connecticut Farms used to be a major settlement until British forces sacked and burned the town at the Battle of Connecticut Farms.

The CDP is bordered by Elmwood Avenue and Stuyvesant Avenue to the north, by Rosemont Avenue, Bond Drive, and Burke Parkway to the east, by the Garden State Parkway to the south, by Chestnut Street to the southwest, and by Pennsylvania Avenue to the west. Downtown Union borders the neighborhood to the north.

U.S. Route 22 passes through the southern part of the CDP, leading east 5 miles (8 km) to its terminus near Newark International Airport and southwest 20 miles (32 km) to Somerville.

== Demographics ==
Historical population
| Census | Pop. | Note | %± |
|---|---|---|---|
| 2020 | 545 | | — |
U.S. Decennial Census; 2020

Connecticut Farms first appeared as a census designated place in the 2020 U.S. census.

=== 2020 census ===
Connecticut Farms, New Jersey – Racial and ethnic composition Note: the US Census treats Hispanic/Latino as an ethnic category. This table excludes Latinos from the racial categories and assigns them to a separate category. Hispanics/Latinos may be of any race.
| Race / Ethnicity (NH = Non-Hispanic) | Pop 2020 | % 2020 |
|---|---|---|
| White alone (NH) | 235 | 43.12% |
| Black or African American alone (NH) | 87 | 15.96% |
| Native American or Alaska Native alone (NH) | 1 | 0.18% |
| Asian alone (NH) | 51 | 9.36% |
| Native Hawaiian or Pacific Islander alone (NH) | 0 | 0.00% |
| Other race alone (NH) | 9 | 1.65% |
| Mixed race or Multiracial (NH) | 20 | 3.67% |
| Hispanic or Latino (any race) | 142 | 26.06% |
| Total | 545 | 100.00% |
