= Battle of Connecticut Farms =

1780 battle of the American Revolutionary War

Coordinates: 40.6951°N 74.2734°W

- Part of the American Revolutionary War
Date	June 7, 1780
Location	Connecticut and Concur (now Union Township), New Jersey
Result	Inconclusive

Belligerents
United States	Great Britain; Hesse-Kassel

Commanders and leaders
William Maxwell	Wilhelm von Knyphausen

Strength
12,000	6,000

Casualties and losses
Total:210; 35 killed; 139 wounded; 10 captured; 22 missing	Total:307; 25 killed; 234 wounded; 48 missing

The Battle of Connecticut Farms, fought June 7, 1780, was one of the last major battles between British and American forces in the northern colonies during the American Revolutionary War. Hessian General Wilhelm von Knyphausen, in command of the British garrison at New York City, made an attempt to reach the principal Continental Army encampment at Morristown, New Jersey. Knyphausen's advance was strongly met by companies of the New Jersey militia at Connecticut Farms (present-day Union Township). After stiff resistance, the militia were forced to withdraw, but the battle and skirmishing that preceded it sufficiently delayed Knyphausen's advance that he remained there for the night. After realizing that further advance on Morristown would probably be met by even more resistance, Knyphausen withdrew back toward New York.

== Background ==
Lieutenant General Wilhelm von Knyphausen received word from spies that General George Washington's main army at Morristown, New Jersey, had been reduced by desertion and disease to only 3,500 men and was plagued by mutinies and low morale. Seeing an opportunity to inflict a mortal blow on the Revolutionary cause, Knyphausen decided to move against Washington. Knyphausen had also been led to believe that the war-weary people of New Jersey would give little resistance to his invasion. Knyphausen's plan called for his troops to advance from Elizabethtown, to seven miles northwest and seize the town of Springfield and Hobart Gap by sunrise on June 7. Washington's army was protected from attack by the Watchung Mountains, and Hobart Gap was the pass that led through them; possession of which would allow an eleven-mile advance across flat ground to hit Washington's main encampment.

Knyphausen's corps comprised some 6,000 men. The 1st Division, commanded by Brigadier General Thomas Stirling, consisted of the British 37th and 38th Regiments of Foot; the Hessian Prince's Own Leib-Regiment, the Hessian Regiment von Donop and the Hessian Corps of Jägers. The 2nd Division, under Major General Edward Mathew, comprised the British 22nd and 57th Regiments of Foot and the 1st and 4th New Jersey Volunteers.

== Battle ==
On June 6, Knyphausen's troops boarded boats on Staten Island and, at midnight, started to land at Elizabethtown Point, New Jersey. As the column moved westward, one of the first shots fired severely wounded Brigadier General Stirling, upon which command of the 1st Division passed to Hessian Colonel Ludwig von Wurmb. The resulting confusion cost the British column valuable time. As the sun rose on June 7, about 60 New Jersey militiamen under Ensign Moses Ogden, one of whose men had wounded Stirling, fought a rearguard action to try to delay the British advance in an orchard near Governor Livingston's mansion. They were quickly swept away. A quarter-mile (about 0.5 km) further west, Colonel Elias Dayton, with a detachment of the New Jersey Continental Brigade and more militia, skirmished with the invaders before falling back to Connecticut Farms. The British forces would be spotted by sentries along the Watchung Mountains activating a local beacon network to alert both the Continental Army and local militias to their presence.

At about 8 a.m., Brigadier General William Maxwell, with his New Jersey Brigade and a force of militia, received the attack of the British 1st Division. Using trees and bushes for cover, the Americans held their ground for three hours until von Wurmb was reinforced by General Mathew and part of his 2nd Division. Now 3,000-strong, the British drove the Americans through Connecticut Farms (now Union Township, New Jersey) toward Springfield. Knyphausen noted, "The Rebels, as they often did, withdrew from house to house and from wood path to wood path, resisting with all means available". The victors plundered the village and set on fire at least a dozen of its houses. General George Washington now arrived on the scene from his headquarters and sent forward his personal Guard of 153 men under Major Caleb Gibbs. Gibbs charged a Hessian unit, incurring 3 killed and 4 wounded, but to no avail. With the sun now setting, Knyphausen halted his advance.

During the capture of Connecticut and Concur, a stray bullet killed a civilian named Ball. In addition, Hannah Caldwell, wife of the Reverend James Caldwell, a chaplain in Washington's army, was shot dead as she sat in her house with her children. Thomas Fleming recounts the Caldwells' maid, Abigail Lennington, seeing a British light infantryman outside the window. Fleming describes what happened next: "Nervously expecting trouble, the light infantryman approached the window, his finger on the trigger, ... Abigail Lennington shrank back, pulling the little boy with her. Probably the…soldier caught a glimpse of her as she moved away from the window. It was a bright, sunny day, and it seems doubtful that a man standing several feet away from the window could see very far into a room that had no windows in three walls. But a movement, any movement, was all this jittery man ... needed to see". He fired his double-loaded musket through the window and both bullets struck Mrs. Caldwell. Moments later, the remainder of the soldier's squad entered the Caldwell home and started to ransack it before being ordered out by their officers.

== Aftermath ==
That evening, Knyphausen and his commanders evaluated the situation. He had failed to reach Hobart Gap and was surprised by the numbers of New Jersey militia who had assembled to oppose him, some of them from as far away as Hopewell, New Jersey. If he resumed his advance, "he was certain to bring on a general engagement with Washington's entrenched army. With the Americans in firm possession of the high ground and the militia swarming on the Royal army’s flanks", the prospects did not look good. Accordingly, Knyphausen decided to withdraw. The next day, June 8, saw some minor skirmishing as the British column retraced its steps back to Elizabethtown Point. One British soldier was captured at 6 a.m., while an officer and 16 men of the 22nd Regiment were taken prisoner as they guarded the Elizabethtown road. Several Americans were killed by British artillery fire. A fortnight later, Knyphausen made a second attempt to capture the Hobart Gap and threaten Washington's main army at the Battle of Springfield.

The official casualty return for the Continental troops in this action gave 12 killed, 50 wounded, 13 missing; of whom 6 killed, 38 hurt and 11 missing were from Maxwell's New Jersey Brigade. This return did not include militia losses. Thomas Fleming says that the Pennsylvania Packet of July 8, 1780 reported that the militia casualties for the whole period of June 7–23 were 10 killed, 40 wounded and 10 prisoners. Including the losses on June 23, which were 13 killed, 49 wounded and 9 missing, the combined American casualties against Knyphausen's expedition, June 7–23, were 35 killed, 139 wounded, 10 captured and 22 missing. The British loss for the entire expedition that began with the Battle of Connecticut Farms on June 7 and ended with the engagement of June 23 at the Battle of Springfield was 25 killed, 234 wounded and 48 missing.

== See also ==
- American Revolutionary War § Stalemate in the North. Places ' Battle of Connecticut Farms ' in overall sequence and strategic context.
