= Springfield (CDP), New Jersey =

Populated place in Union County, New Jersey, US

Springfield, New Jersey
- Census-designated place
- Location in Union County Location in New Jersey Location in the United States
- Coordinates: 40°42′38″N 74°18′30″W
- Country: United States
- State: New Jersey
- County: Union
- Township: Springfield

Area
  - Total: 0.39 sq mi (1.00 km^{2})
  - Land: 0.39 sq mi (1.00 km^{2})
  - Water: 0 sq mi (0.00 km^{2})
- Elevation: 97 ft (30 m)

Population (2020)
  - Total: 1,518
  - Density: 3,913/sq mi (1,510.9/km^{2})
- Time zone: UTC−05:00 (Eastern (EST))
  - Summer (DST): UTC−04:00 (EDT)
- ZIP Code: 07081
- Area code: 908
- FIPS code: 34-70018
- GNIS feature ID: 2390339

Springfield is a census-designated place (CDP) comprising the downtown area of Springfield Township, Union County, in the U.S. state of New Jersey. It was first listed as a CDP prior to the 2020 census.

The CDP is bordered by Interstate 78 to the north, state route 577 and Meisel Avenue to the east, Cottage Lane to the south, Milltown Road, South Springfield Avenue, and Shunpike Road to the southwest, and Mountain Avenue, Caldwell Place, and Morris Avenue to the west. Morris Avenue is the main street through the downtown, leading southeast as New Jersey Route 82, 6 miles (10 km) to Elizabeth, and northwest as Route 124, 1.5 miles (2 km) to the Summit city limits.

== Demographics ==
Historical population
Census	Pop.	Note	%±
2020	1,518		—
U.S. Decennial Census

Springfield first appeared as a census designated place in the 2020 U.S. census.

=== 2020 census ===
Springfield CDP, New Jersey – Racial and ethnic composition Note: the US Census treats Hispanic/Latino as an ethnic category. This table excludes Latinos from the racial categories and assigns them to a separate category. Hispanics/Latinos may be of any race.
Race / Ethnicity (NH = Non-Hispanic)	Pop 2020	% 2020
White alone (NH)	917	60.41%
Black or African American alone (NH)	102	6.72%
Native American or Alaska Native alone (NH)	1	0.07%
Asian alone (NH)	114	7.51%
Native Hawaiian or Pacific Islander alone (NH)	0	0.00%
Other Race alone (NH)	14	0.92%
Mixed race or Multiracial (NH)	81	5.34%
Hispanic or Latino (any race)	289	19.04%
Total	1,518	100.00%
