= Scotch Plains-Fanwood Regional School District =

School district in Union County, New Jersey, US

Address
- 512 Cedar Street Scotch Plains, Union County, New Jersey, 07076; United States
- Coordinates: 40.639709°N 74.366592°W

District information
- Grades: PreK–12
- Superintendent: Joan Mast
- Business administrator: Christopher Jones
- Schools: 8

Students and staff
- Enrollment: 5,758 (as of 2023–24)
- Faculty: 451.7 FTEs
- Student–teacher ratio: 12.8:1

Other information
- District Factor Group: I
- Website: www.spfk12.org
Ind.	Per pupil	District spending	Rank (*)	K-12 average	%± vs. average
1A	Total Spending	$16,156	19	$18,891	−14.5%
1	Budgetary Cost	12,791	19	14,783	−13.5%
2	Classroom Instruction	7,729	14	8,763	−11.8%
6	Support Services	1,823	22	2,392	−23.8%
8	Administrative Cost	1,175	11	1,485	−20.9%
10	Operations & Maintenance	1,760	63	1,783	−1.3%
13	Extracurricular Activities	281	63	268	4.9%
16	Median Teacher Salary	63,440	43	64,043
Data from NJDoE 2014 Taxpayers' Guide to Education Spending. *Of K-12 districts with more than 3,500 students. Lowest spending=1; Highest=103

The Scotch Plains-Fanwood Regional School District is a regional public school district serving students from two communities in Union County, in the U.S. state of New Jersey. The district serves students in pre-kindergarten through twelfth grade, who come from the adjoining municipalities of Scotch Plains and Fanwood. The district has five elementary schools (PreK–4), two middle schools (grades 5–8) and a comprehensive high school (grades 9–12).

As of the 2023–24 school year, the district, comprised of eight schools, had an enrollment of 5,758 students and 451.7 classroom teachers (on an FTE basis), for a student–teacher ratio of 12.8:1.

== History ==
The district had been classified by the New Jersey Department of Education as being in District Factor Group "I", the second-highest of eight groupings. District Factor Groups organize districts statewide to allow comparison by common socioeconomic characteristics of the local districts. From lowest socioeconomic status to highest, the categories are A, B, CD, DE, FG, GH, I and J.

Shackamaxon School, was built in 1951 (the same year as Evergreen School) and operated until 1981, when it was leased to the Jewish Federation of Central New Jersey as their Jewish Community Center and offices. The Federation bought the building outright five years later.

In 2021, Park Middle School, was renamed to honor Malcolm E. Nettingham, who had served during World War II with the Tuskegee Airmen.

== Awards and recognition ==
In 2022, the United States Department of Education announced that William J. McGinn School was named as a National Blue Ribbon School, along with eight other schools in the state and 297 schools nationwide.

== Schools ==
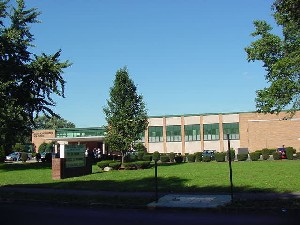
Scotch Plains-Fanwood High School

Schools in the district (with 2023–24 enrollment data from the National Center for Education Statistics) are:

Elementary schools

- Howard B. Brunner Elementary School with 415 students in grades PreK–4
  - Scott Bortnick, principal
- J. Ackerman Coles School with 548 students in grades PreK–4
  - Sandra Fehte, principal
- Evergreen School with 425 students in grades PreK–4
  - Erin Mullman, principal
- William J. McGinn School with 549 students in grades K–4
  - Sasha Slocum, principal
- School One Elementary School with 412 students in grades PreK–4
  - Justin Fiory, principal

Middle schools

- Malcolm E. Nettingham Middle School with 933 students in grades 5–8
  - Jocelyn Dumaresq, principal
- Terrill Middle School with 834 students in grades 5–8
  - Kevin Holloway, principal

High school

- Scotch Plains-Fanwood High School with 1,551 students in grades 9–12
  - Warren Hynes, principal

== Administration ==
Core members of the district's administration are:

- Joan Mast, superintendent of schools
- Christopher Jones, business administrator and board secretary

== Board of education ==
The district's board of education is comprised of nine members, who set policy and oversee the fiscal and educational operation of the district through its administration. As a Type II school district, the board's trustees are elected directly by voters to serve three-year terms of office on a staggered basis, with three seats up for election each year held (since 2012) as part of the November general election. The board appoints a superintendent to oversee the district's day-to-day operations and a business administrator to supervise the business functions of the district. Seats on the board of education are allocated based on the population of the constituent districts, with seven seats assigned to Scotch Plains and two to Fanwood.
