= Roselle Park High School =

High school in Mercer County, New Jersey, US

Location
- 185 West Webster Avenue; Roselle Park, Union County, New Jersey 07204; United States
- 40.665752°N 74.271808°W

Information
- Type: Public high school
- School district: Roselle Park School District
- NCES School ID: 341431005664
- Principal: Sarah Costa
- Faculty: 45.1 FTEs
- Grades: 9-12
- Enrollment: 593 (as of 2024–25)
- Student to teacher ratio: 13.1:1
- Colors: Cardinal and white
- Athletics conference: Union County Interscholastic Athletic Conference (general); Big Central Football Conference (football)
- Team name: Panthers
- Rival: Abraham Clark High School
- Newspaper: Panther Press
- Website: hs.rpsd.org

Roselle Park High School is a four-year public high school located in Roselle Park, in Union County, in the U.S. state of New Jersey, operating as the lone secondary school of the Roselle Park School District. Since 2007, Roselle Park High School serves students in ninth through twelfth grades. The school has been accredited by the Middle States Association of Colleges and Schools Commission on Elementary and Secondary Schools since 1928.

As of the 2024–25 school year, the school had an enrollment of 593 students and 45.1 classroom teachers (on an FTE basis), for a student–teacher ratio of 13.1:1. There were 267 students (45.0% of enrollment) eligible for free lunch and 66 (11.1% of students) eligible for reduced-cost lunch.

== Awards, recognition and rankings ==
The school was the 191st-ranked public high school in New Jersey out of 339 schools statewide in the New Jersey Monthly magazine's September 2014 cover story on the state's "Top Public High Schools", using a new ranking methodology. The school had been ranked 122nd in the state of 328 schools in 2012, after being ranked 190th in 2010 out of 322 schools listed. The magazine ranked the school 2008 out of 316 schools. The school was ranked 156th in the magazine's September 2006 issue, which surveyed 316 schools across the state.

Schooldigger.com ranked the school tied for 104th out of 381 public high schools statewide in its 2011 rankings (an increase of 92 positions from the 2010 ranking) which were based on the combined percentage of students classified as proficient or above proficient on the mathematics (88.3%) and language arts literacy (94.5%) components of the High School Proficiency Assessment (HSPA).

== History ==
Upon the incorporation of the Borough of Roselle Park in 1901, the municipal school district assumed control of Livingston School, which had been constructed in the late 19th century. As the borough population grew, it was decided to construct a new school building at the corner of West Grant Avenue and Locust Street. Ground breaking for the new school, to house students from kindergarten through grade 12, was held on August 8, 1908, and the building opened to students in September 1909. The building contained 11 classrooms, three recitation rooms, rooms for domestic science and manual training, a laboratory, a library, a gymnasium, an assembly hall, and offices. The original building remains in use as the Robert Gordon Elementary School.

In 1919, the high school moved to a new building formerly occupied by the Hercules Munitions Company and located at the corner of West Clay Avenue and Locust Street. However, industrial arts and physical education classes continued to meet in the previous school building. During this time, students from the surrounding municipalities of Garwood, Kenilworth, and Springfield attended Roselle Park High School on a tuition basis.

On April 30, 1931, the cornerstone was laid for a new building for the high school to be located on West Grant Avenue adjacent to the Robert Gordon School that was to be constructed at a cost of $350,000 (equivalent to $7.4 million in 2025). This building remains in use as the Roselle Park Middle School.

In January 1961, Roselle Park voters rejected a proposal for the construction of a new high school that would have cost $2.5 million to build (equivalent to $26.9 million in 2025). The current high school building opened to students in September 1963. In 1993, a new wing was constructed, adding three additional classrooms.

== Athletics ==
The Roselle Park High School Panthers compete in the Union County Interscholastic Athletic Conference, which is comprised of public and private high schools in Union County and was established after a reorganization of sports leagues in Northern New Jersey by the New Jersey State Interscholastic Athletic Association (NJSIAA). Prior to the NJSIAA's 2009 realignment, the school had participated in the Mountain Valley Conference, which included public and private high schools in Essex County, Somerset County and Union County. With 434 students in grades 10-12, the school was classified by the NJSIAA for the 2019–20 school year as Group I for most athletic competition purposes, which included schools with an enrollment of 75 to 476 students in that grade range. The football team competes in Division A of the Big Central Football Conference, which includes 60 public and private high schools in Hunterdon, Middlesex, Somerset, Union and Warren counties, which are broken down into 10 divisions by size and location. The school was classified by the NJSIAA as Group I North for football for 2024–2026, which included schools with 254 to 474 students. The school's Athletic Director is James Foy.

Sports at Roselle Park High School include fall, winter, and spring seasons:

Fall sports: Football coached by Terry Hanratty, Boys' Soccer coached by Patrick Pietro, Girls' Soccer coached by Anthony Trezza, and Volleyball coached by Dennis Dagounis.

Winter sports: Boys' Basketball coached by Jon Bergbauer, Girls' Basketball coached by Richard Suchanski, Bowling coached by Vicent Fucci, and Wrestling Coached by Ryan Rooney.

Spring sports: Baseball coached by Nick Agoglia, Softball coached by Fran Maggio, Golf coached by Bruce Coultas, and Track and Field coached by Glenn Grieco and Shannon Smith.

The boys' basketball team won the Group III state championship in 1928 (defeating Garfield High School in the final round of the tournament), won the Group II title in 1945 (vs. Carteret High School) and 1952 (vs. Burlington City High School), and won the Group I title in 1950 (vs. North Arlington High School).

The baseball team won the Group I state championship in 1972 (defeating Pitman High School in the tournament final) and 1987 (vs. Kingsway Regional High School). The 1972 team finished the season with a 19-5 record after winning the Group I title with a 9-6 victory in the championship game.

The football team won the North II Group I state sectional championship in 1979, 1992 and 1993. An 11-0 season in 1992 culminated with a 27-6 win against Butler High School in the North II Group I state sectional championship game. The 1993 finished the season with an 11-0 record and won its second consecutive North II Group I title with a 10-7 victory on a field goal in overtime against Summit High School in the championship game. The school has had a longstanding football rivalry with Abraham Clark High School in Roselle, with Roselle Park leading the series with an overall record of 51-40-8 through 2017. NJ.com listed the rivalry as 31st best in their 2017 list "Ranking the 31 fiercest rivalries in N.J. HS football".

The boys' wrestling team won the North II Group I state sectional title in 1980–1991, 1993, 1997, 1998, 2002, 2003, 2010, 2014, 2018 and 2022, and won the Central Jersey Group I title in 2004–2006, 2008, 2009 and 2011. The team won the Group I state championship in 1982 and 1997 (as co-champion with Paulsboro High School). The program's 22 sectional titles are tied for fourth-most among schools in New Jersey. In 2018, Roselle Park High School became just the fourth high school in the United States to reach 1,000 wins in dual meets, joining Granite City High School (in Illinois), Vacaville High School (in California) and Paulsboro High School (in New Jersey) in the elite 1,000-win club.

The boys' track team won the indoor track Group I state championship in 1980.

The boys' track team won the Group I indoor relay state championship in 1982.

The girls' tennis team won the Group I state championship in 1986 (against Mahwah High School in the final match of the tournament) and 1997 (vs. Montgomery High School).

The softball team won the Group I state championship in 2003 (defeating Gloucester City High School in the playoff finals) and 2018 (vs. Gloucester City). The team won the 2018 Group I title with a 4-3 win in extra innings against Gloucester City in the championship game before losing to eventual-champion Steinert High School in the quarterfinal round of the Tournament of Champions to finish the season with a 27-3 record.

The boys' bowling team won the Group I state championship in 2016.

== Clubs and organizations ==
Clubs and organizations at RPHS include Crisis Center, Dads Club, Ecology Club, ESL Club, National Honor Society and Peer Leadership.

== Administration ==
The school's principal is Sarah Costa. Her administration team includes two vice principals.

== Notable alumni ==
- Valentino Ambrosio (born 2000), American football placekicker who played for the Tulane Green Wave football team
- Michael Ausiello (born 1972), television industry journalist, author, and actor, who wrote the 2017 memoir, Spoiler Alert: The Hero Dies
- Rick Barry (born 1944), former professional basketball player
- Frank R. Burns (1928–2012, class of 1945), American football player and coach, who was head coach of the Rutgers Scarlet Knights from 1973 to 1982
- Tom Conrad (c. 1910–1986), football, basketball and baseball player and coach
- Adam Lakomy (born 2006), artistic gymnast who is the 2024 Junior Pan American champion
- Keith Loneker (1971–2017), actor who played in the NFL
- Chris Ostrowsky (born c. 1970), college football coach who has been offensive coordinator and quarterbacks coach for the Yale Bulldogs football team, since 2023
