= Rahway Valley Railroad =

- Lines of the Rahway Valley Railroad
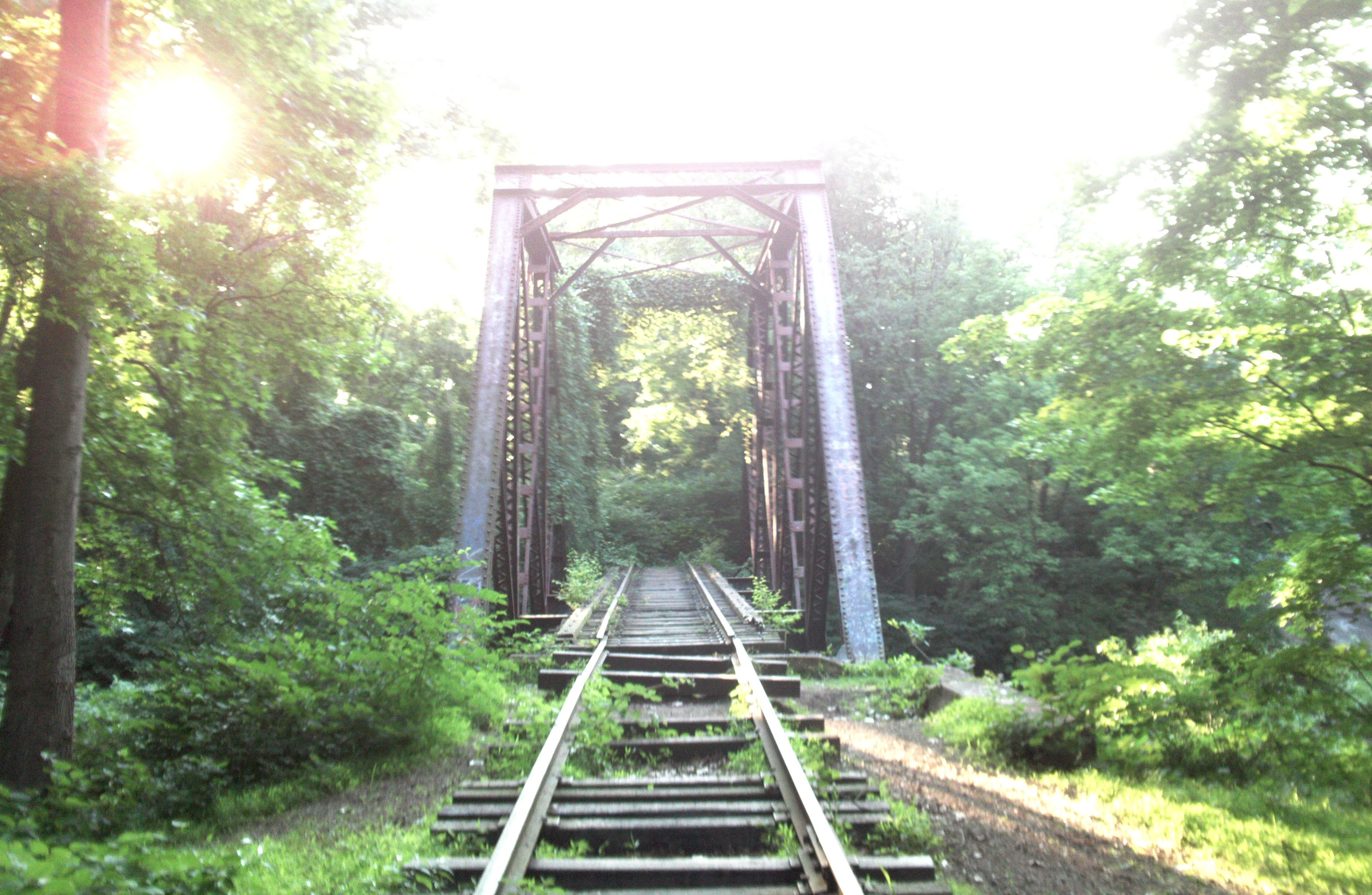
- RVRR bridge over the Rahway River

Overview
- Headquarters: Kenilworth, New Jersey
- Reporting mark: RV
- Locale: Union County, New Jersey
- Dates of operation: 1897–1992
- Successor: Morristown and Erie Railway

Technical
- Track gauge: 4 ft 8 1/2 in (1,435 mm) standard gauge

The Rahway Valley Railroad (RV) was a shortline railroad in the Northeastern United States. During their operations, the RV was considered as one of the most successful shortline railroads in U.S. history. The RV interchanged with the Lehigh Valley Railroad (LV) in Roselle Park, the Central Railroad of New Jersey (CNJ) in Cranford, and the Delaware, Lackawanna and Western Railroad (DL&W) in Summit.

The railroad was instrumental in the development of many towns along their right-of-way, including Kenilworth, Union Township, Springfield. By 1986, the RV experienced declining freight traffic, and they lost their liability insurance coverage, That same year, the railroad was sold to the Delaware Otsego Corporation (DO). Freight customers abandoned the railroad to the point only one remained, and in 1992, the RV consequently ceased operations.

== Rail trail on the Rahway Valley Railroad main line ==
Area residents have proposed to create a 7.3-mile (11.7 km) pedestrian linear park to parallel the trackage of the abandoned Rahway Valley Railroad. The rail trail would lie eastbound from Overlook Medical Center on the edge of downtown Summit, and then lie south along the old track bed through Springfield, Union, and Kenilworth, before ending at the southwest edge of Roselle Park at the Cranford border.

A northern portion of the rail trail on the RV mainline is under construction as the Summit Park Line, with a footbridge over Morris Avenue installed in October 2022.

Development of the southern portion of the rail trail, south of Route 22, is under way, as of 2023. It runs past the Galloping Hill Golf Course through Kenilworth and Roselle Park. The New Jersey Department of Transportation (NJDOT), which owns the track bed, has been working to clear it for trail usage. Funding for a portion of the rail trail was announced in July 2023.

== History ==
=== New York and New Orange Railroad ===
The Rahway Valley Railroad's earliest predecessor, the New York and New Orange Railroad (NY&NO), was incorporated on May 6, 1897, by the promoters of the New Orange Industrial Association. The organization had been formed in 1894 by several Elmira, New York businessmen, to redevelop some land on the border of Cranford and Union as a town called New Orange (now Kenilworth). The Elmirans prospected a profitable manufacturing town with many amenities, and the NY&NO was formed to serve the town's residents and factories. The initial stretch between Aldene and New Orange was surveyed in mid-1897 by J. Wallace Higgins and Anthony Grippo.

Between July 1897 and March 1898, contractor Frank H. Bailey of Elmira, constructed a 2-mile (3.2 km) stretch of trackage for the NY&NO, and in the process, a connection was made with the Central Railroad of New Jersey (CNJ) at Cranford. During the winter of 1898-1899, an extension was made to N. 19th Street in New Orange, and shortly thereafter, the 0.5-mile (0.80 km) long Lehigh Valley Branch was constructed, to connect with the Lehigh Valley Railroad (LV) at Roselle Park. In July 1899, the NY&NO's first locomotive, No. 1 (named "New Orange"), was acquired and placed into service. The CNJ operated the NY&NO, until the railroad was formally opened for passenger service, on August 1. In September 1900, a second locomotive, No. 2 (named "Baltusrol") was acquired and placed into service. The growing population in the town of New Orange was found to be less successful than its promoters had hoped. The NY&NO quickly fell into default, and on February 16, 1901, the railroad was sold under foreclosure to the hastily organized New Orange Four Junction Railroad.

=== New Orange Four Junction Railroad ===
The New Orange Four Junction Railroad (NOFJ) was incorporated on February 4, 1901, by several of the New Orange promoters to assume control of the struggling NY&NO. William W. Cole, one of the Elmira men, took charge of the enterprise as president and general manager. Day-to-day operations were carried out by Horatio F. Dankel, the railroad's superintendent. Contemplations were made for the railroad to extend their trackage to Irvington, Millburn, and Summit. Multiple surveys were made, and some work was done in acquiring some nearby right-of-ways, but the NOFJ was unable to extend their trackage.

In October 1902, the Pennsylvania Railroad (PRR) purchased Tin Kettle and Press hills in New Orange for the purposes of excavating them for fill material, to be used in filling Greenville Yard in Jersey City, Waverly Yard in Newark, and the approach to the North River Tunnels. The NOFJ began to haul hopper cars of fill material between the excavation sites in New Orange to their Roselle Park interchange with the LV. In 1904, the New Orange Industrial Association failed, and the remaining promoters engaged several New York City businessmen and reorganized the enterprise as the Kenilworth Realty Corporation. These men partnered with Louis Keller, founder of the Social Register and the Baltusrol Golf Club, to charter the Rahway Valley Railroad and construct an extension of the NOFJ to Summit. The two railroads were consolidated on March 1, 1905.

=== Rahway Valley Railroad ===
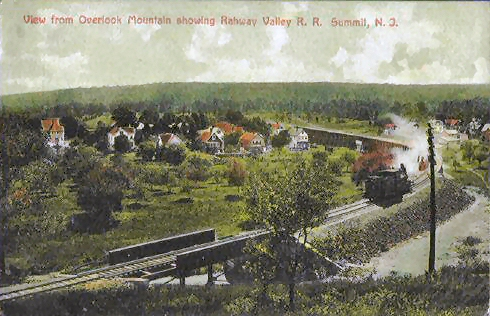
View of the Rahway Valley Railroad at Summit circa 1910

Louis Keller, the founder and owner of the Baltusrol Golf Club, was dissatisfied with the transportation to his golf club over the rough dirt roads that existed in Union County, New Jersey in the early 1900s. His desire for improved transportation for the club was frustrated by the New Orange Industrial Association, as their efforts to extend their railroad to Summit came to grief. Keller became involved with the New Orange syndicate in the Cross Country Railroad project, but it went nowhere. On July 18, 1904, after the association had failed, and was reorganized as the Kenilworth Realty Corporation, Keller partnered with its new principals to charter the Rahway Valley Railroad (RV). The NOFJ and the new RV were subsequently consolidated, on March 1, 1905.

The RV was opened to Springfield on May 25, 1905, to Baltusrol on January 1, 1906, and to Summit on August 2. After a bridge across Broad Street was completed, the RV filed an application with the Delaware, Lackawanna and Western Railroad (DL&W) for a connection at Summit. The DL&W was opposed to the connection, and multiple court battles ensued, eventually rising to the level of the United States Supreme Court. RV-DL&W connection was not completed, until March 1930.

The RV obtained a large sum of debt from their line construction, and without their desired DL&W connection, and a lack of lineside industry, the railroad was unable to pay their indebtedness. The railroad obtained a substantial mortgage, secured by bonds owned by the Elmira interests. In 1909, a call feature on this bond issue became active, which effectively reverted control of the railroad to the Elmirans. To circumvent this, Keller organized an operating company, the Rahway Valley Company, to lease and operate the RV. After the Elmirans died, their respective estates looked to liquidate their bond holdings and wished to sell the railroad. Keller eventually acquired the mortgage bonds, supplementing his status as the railroad's majority shareholder. The Keller family continued to maintain a majority ownership of the RV, until 1986.

During World War I, the RV experienced booming traffic by serving military firms: a munitions plant in Kenilworth, and a gunpowder plant in Union. Workers for both plants were delivered to the RV at a fast pace, by the Lehigh Valley, the CNJ, and the nearby Staten Island Railway. An explosion at the Wright plant caused widespread damage in the surrounding area, and rumors of German spies promoted the RV to hire armed guards to protect the property.

After World War I ended, freight and passenger traffic both decreased on the RV, and it worsened the railroad's financial position. A tumult in the railroad's managerial staff ended with Roger A. Clark becoming General Manager in 1920. Through Clark's efforts, and that of his son, George, the railroad's fortunes began to change. In 1922, Louis Keller died, and his estate made Roger Clark president. Clark abolished the last vestiges of the railroad's passenger service and began to replace their aging locomotives. In 1922, Nos. 9 and 10 were traded in to General Equipment Co. for No. 11, a 2-6-0 "Mogul"-type. No. 12 was purchased in 1927, but it was deemed too large for continued operation over the railroad and was retired a year later. In 1928, Nos. 13 and 14 were purchased, and the RV obtained an adequate locomotive roster with them.

In 1932, Roger Clark died, and the Keller estate appointed his son George A. Clark as president. In 1934, under George Clark's management, the Rahway Valley turned a profit for the first time in many years. Clark also continued to attract new businesses to locate on the line. An increase in larger industries along the railroad also occurred. In the early 1950s, with the development of improved highways, trucks began serving the Rahway Valley's customers.

Clark began to dieselize the railroad in 1951, with the purchase of GE 70-ton switcher locomotive No. 16. For the next few years, the Rahway Valley used both steam (Nos. 13 and 15) and diesel (No. 16) power until a second 70-ton switcher (No. 17) was purchased in 1954. No. 13 was subsequently scrapped, while No. 15 was later sold to Steamtown, U.S.A.

In 1969, George A. Clark died in his office in the old Kenilworth station, and his son Robert G. Clark was appointed president. By that time, traffic on the Rahway Valley had decreased significantly. With smaller profits came deferred track maintenance, and weeds began to grow through the infrastructure. In the early 1970s, the RV closed their line in Maplewood. Bob Clark attempted to attract new businesses to the line, and he was temporarily successful, but his customer base continued to be siphoned away by trucks. Clark unexpectedly died in 1975.

The Keller estate, still owners of the railroad, appointed experienced railroader Benard Cahill to the presidency. Cahill was able to bring new life to the railroad, and he secured grants from the state to improve track conditions. He also obtained new office space in a former Lehigh Valley passenger coach that he purchased and parked on a siding in Kenilworth, since the previous offices in the old Kenilworth station were burned in 1974.

In 1980. passenger trains were again run over the Rahway Valley Railroad, but for only one week, for the occasion of the U.S. Open being held at the Baltusrol Golf Club. Trains were operated between Kenilworth and Baltusrol, in a push-pull formation by Nos. 16 and 17. The train, sponsored by the Union County Trust Company, utilized passenger coaches leased from the Cooperstown and Charlotte Valley Railroad (C&CV) in New York.

Despite improvements and rehabilitation being made, the formation of Conrail in 1976 affected the Rahway Valley Railroad's operations. Previously having three independent railroads to interchange with, the RV now only interchanged with Conrail in three separate connections. That same year, the final train to Summit was operated, before the interchange was closed. The RV subsequently prioritizing the former Lehigh Valley connection, and they neglected the former CNJ connection at Aldene. But despite these new predicaments the RV under Cahill kept trudging along, increasingly relying on its largest customer, Monsanto Corp. in Kenilworth, as slowly more of the smaller customers switched to trucks.

=== Delaware Otsego ownership ===
In early 1986, during the break out of the liability insurance crisis, the Rahway Valley discovered that their liability insurance policies had been cancelled, and the railroad was unable to afford any insurance coverage. The owners quickly opted to contract an experienced company to operate the RV, and in March 1986, they contracted the Delaware Otsego Corporation (DO), which assumed control of the railroad in December 1987. Under DO ownership, the RV began to interchange with the nearby Staten Island Railway of Staten Island, New York, via trackage rights over Conrail and NJ Transit in Cranford, and Staten Island crews became assigned to operate the RV.

In 1989, Nos. 16 and 17 were transferred from the RV to Binghamton, New York, and they were replaced with Staten Island No. 120, an Ex-Chesapeake and Ohio EMD SW9. Some lightweight locomotives from the New York, Susquehanna and Western Railway (NYS&W) were also transferred to the RV. In 1988, the RV moved their primary interchange to the former CNJ connection at Cranford, and they ripped up their unused LV connection. As DO continued to operate the RV, the RV's customers continued to abandon the railroad, and it involved the closure of Monsanto Corp. and the discontinuance of Jaeger Lumber, in 1991. In April 1992, DO ceased operations on both the RV and the Staten Island Railway, with the RV only having one remaining customer. In February 1995, DO sold the RV right-of-way to the state of New Jersey, for $6.4 million.

=== Morristown and Erie stewardship ===
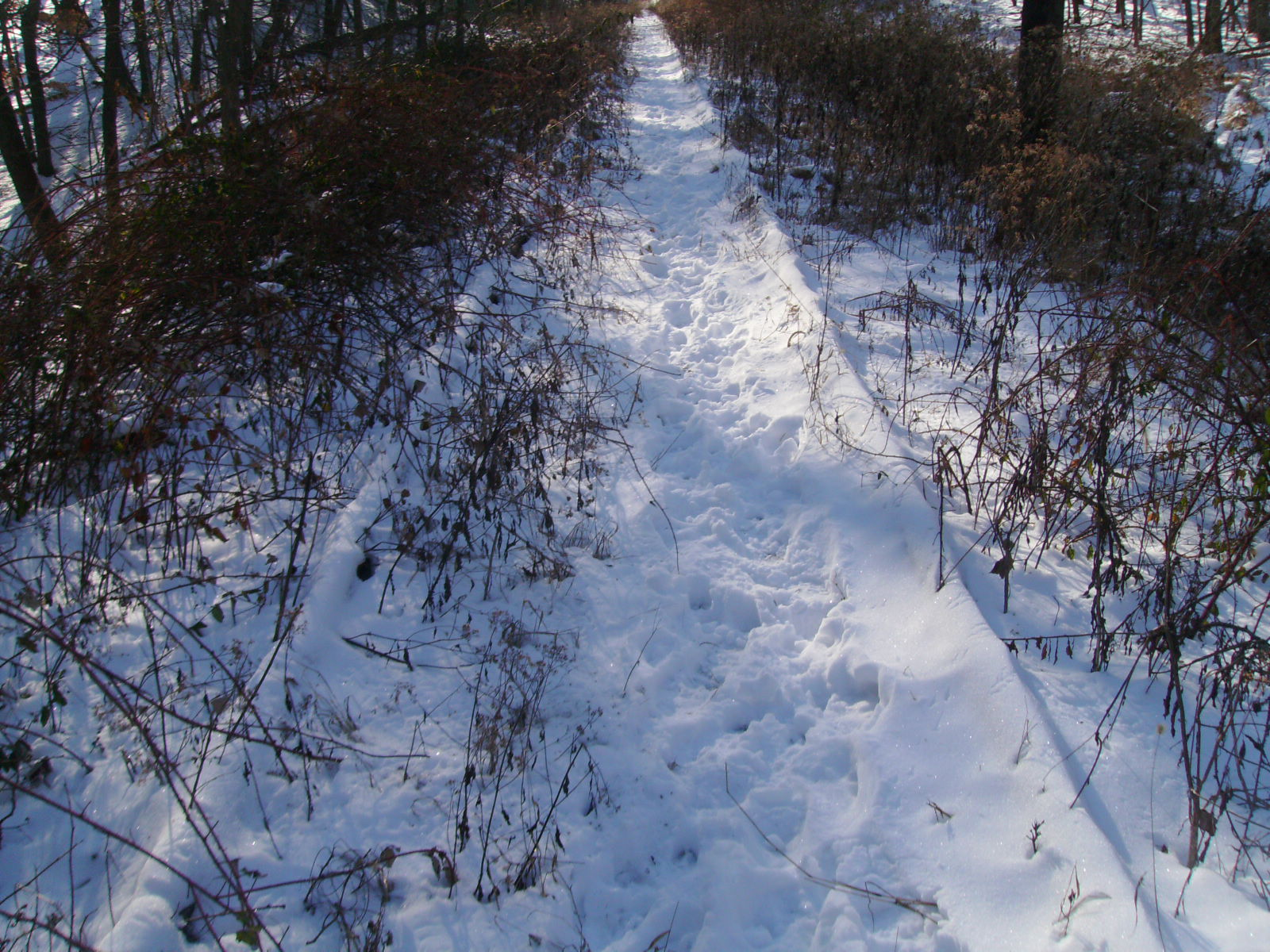
Rahway Valley Railroad trackage along North Michigan Avenue in Kenilworth, New Jersey

In 2001, the Morristown and Erie Railway (M&E) was contracted by the state of New Jersey to rehabilitate and operate the southern portion of the former Rahway Valley Railroad. In July 2005, M&E operations on the southern portion of the former Rahway Valley Railroad commenced, and they continued to interchange with the newly restored Staten Island Railway, via an interchange with Conrail Shared Assets in Cranford.

During 2010, NJDOT struggled to raise funds to rebuild the Rahway Valley line. The majority of the line between Roselle Park and the Union/Springfield border was cleared of trees and thick brushes. New trackage was inserted from the Union/Springfield border to the Union Wye (behind Rahway Avenue). All of the sidings to the railway's potential future customers were left unconnected to the main line. Trackage was inserted in some parts of Kenilworth.

As for the sections past the Union/Springfield border, no progress was made through the towns of Springfield or Summit. By May 15, 2012, the M&E removed all of their assets from the track beds, since they did not exercise their option to extend the operating agreement with Union County.

== Rahway Valley locomotive roster ==
#	Model	Built	Builder	Acquired	Disposition	Notes
1	4-4-0			7/1899	1902, scrapped	Ex-Northern Central Railway #322. Named "New Orange."
2	4-4-0	12/1880	Baldwin Locomotive Works #5394	1900	1903	Ex-Philadelphia, Wilmington & Baltimore Railroad #80. Named "Baltusrol."
3	4-4-0			1901	3/24/1906, wrecked	Ex-Pennsylvania Railroad, class D3 (?). Wrecked in Springfield by runaway coal hopper. Scrapped.
4	2-6-0	1869	Dickson Manufacturing Co.	8/1905	1913	Ex-DL&W Morris & Essex Division #220, Exx-DL&W Morris & Essex Division #92, Exxx-Utica, Chenango & Susquehanna Valley Railroad (DL&W - Utica Division) #15, Exxxx-Lackawanna & Bloomsburg Railroad #23 (named "William E. Dodge"). Acquired from Fitzhugh-Luther Co. and soon discovered to be a piece of junk, "ready to blow up." The Fitzhugh people never made good on it and an order for a second locomotive was cancelled. Noted as out of service in 1908, in need of flues and the boiler was in rough shape. Retired 1910/1. Scrapped about 1913.
5	0-6-0T	8/1882	Baldwin Locomotive Works #6305	4/1906	12/1915	Ex-Central Railroad of New Jersey #710, Exx-Central Railroad of New Jersey #23. Purchased via J.E. Bowen of Norfolk, VA. Used in freight and switching service. Retired 6/2/1913 and stored at Kenilworth. Sold for scrap to M.D. Adelson of Lebanon, PA. Cut up at Kenilworth, loaded into a gondola, and shipped out on 12/13/1915.
6	0-4-4T	2/1889	Baldwin Locomotive Works #9827	12/4/1906	5/1912	Ex-Silver Lake Railway #3, Exx-Manhattan Railway #348, Exxx-Suburban Rapid Transit #13. Purchased from Southern Iron & Equipment Co. Sold to General Equipment Co. To Philadelphia, Bethlehem & New England Railroad #23. Scrapped.
7	2-4-4	6/1908	Baldwin Locomotive Works #32817	6/20/1908	1917	Purchased new from Baldwin for $11,400. Delivered, under its own power, on June 20, 1908. Utilized exclusively for passenger and main track work until 1913. A long wheelbase prevented it from negotiating tight curves on sidings without derailing. Had poor brakes and could only haul three loaded freight cars from Springfield to Summit. Sold to General Equipment Co. To US Army for use at Watervliet Arsenal in Watervliet, NY. Scrapped.
8	2-8-0	3/1900	Pittsburgh Locomotive Works #2070	2/1916	4/1929	Ex-Pittsburgh & Lake Erie Railroad #9319, Exx-Pittsburgh & Lake Erie Railroad #140. Purchased by Louis Keller and leased to railroad. Sold for scrap to General Equipment Co. of Paterson, New Jersey for $7.75 per ton. Dismantled and cut up on the RV and loaded into cars by the scrap dealer. Delivered to the CNJ at Aldene in April 1929. Towing to the scrappers yard was cost prohibitive due to the extensive repairs necessary to make No. 8 acceptable for movement.
9	0-6-0	11/1893	Altoona Machine Shops (PRR) #506	12/1917	10/1922	Ex-Pennsylvania Railroad #506, Class B-4. Retired in 1920 and was stored outside, in disrepair, at Kenilworth. Traded back to General Equipment Co., along with #10, for #11. Sold to Jefferson Construction Co., #11. Sold to Seaboard Air Line, #124. Scrapped May 1930.
10	0-6-0	6/1895	Altoona Machine Shops (PRR)	2/1918	10/1922	Ex-Pennsylvania Railroad #396, Class B-4a. Retired in 1922. Traded to General Equipment Co., along with #9, for No. 11. Sold to Jefferson Construction Co., #10. Sold to Seaboard Air Line, #123. Scrapped May 1930.
11	2-6-0	3/1904	Baldwin Locomotive Works #23934	10/1922	1/1935	Ex-Grafton & Upton Railroad #5. Sold 2/1920 to General Equipment Co. Acquired from General Equipment Co. in trade for Nos. 9 and 10. It was a professed failure by RV crews. Fast passenger type, too light and slippery on the grade to Summit. Worn out, it was retired in 1933. Scrapped.
12	2-8-0	8/1902	Pittsburgh Locomotive Works (ALCo) #25640	9/1927	2/1943	Ex-Bessemer & Lake Erie Railroad #96, Class C1B. Purchased directly from the B&LE for $3,213 including shipping from Greenville, PA. A long wheelbase prevented it from entering tight industrial sidings. Its weight was too great for RV bridges and other infrastructure. Retired in 9/1928 and stored at Kenilworth. Sold for scrap to a Newark, NJ junk dealer who cut it up at Kenilworth from 11/1942 to 2/1943. Scrapped.
13	2-8-0	9/1905	Baldwin Locomotive Works #26355	5/18/1928	4/18/1955	Ex-Lehigh & New England Railroad #19, Class E-7. Purchased from Georgia Car & Locomotive Co. for $6,823. Arrived on the RV 9/1928. Damaged on 2/26/1951 by a crane handling a concrete pipe. Repaired but never used again; retired. Sold for scrap to Newark Iron & Metal Co. of Union, NJ. Towed to their yard on 3/23/1955. Cut up 3/24 to 4/18/1955.
14	2-8-0	9/1905	Baldwin Locomotive Works #26356	8/22/1928	12/15/1951	Ex-Lehigh & New England Railroad #20, Class E-7. Purchased from Georgia Car & Locomotive Co. for $6,239. Arrived on the RV 9/1928. Retired 5/31/1950 due to expired flue time. It was last operated 6/26/1950, for several hours, before leaking staybolts and a cracked flue sheet were discovered. Sold for scrap to J. Kerzman & Sons of Elizabeth, NJ who cut it up at Kenilworth, loaded it into two gondola cars, and shipped it to Bethlehem Steel Co. in Bethlehem, PA on 12/15/1951.
15	2-8-0	6/1916	Baldwin Locomotive Works #43529	7/28/1937	6/5/1959	Ex-Oneida & Western Railroad #20. After suffering freeze damage, it was rebuilt by Baldwin in 1926. Purchased 7/28/1937 via Birmingham Rail & Locomotive Co. for $8,159. Its first day of service on the RV was 8/28/1937. Retired 11/28/1953 and stored at Kenilworth. Sold to F. Nelson Blount 5/1959 and placed on display at Pleasure Island in Wakefield, MA. Sent to Blount's Monadnock, Steamtown & Northern Railroad and it returned to service in 1962. Later Monadnock Northern Railroad and Green Mountain Railroad No. 15. Retired again on 8/12/1973. Moved to the Steamtown National Historic Site in Scranton, PA, where it is presently displayed; inoperable.
16	70-ton	1/1951	General Electric #30838	1/29/1951	12/22/1986	Purchased new. Sold to Delaware Otsego Corporation. Donated in 1995 to United Railroad Historical Society of NJ. Donated in 2017 to Tri-State Railway Historical Society.
17	70-ton	1/1954	General Electric #32130	2/2/1954	12/22/1986	Purchased new. Sold to Delaware Otsego Corporation. Donated in 1995 to United Railroad Historical Society of NJ. Donated in 2017 to Tri-State Railway Historical Society.

== Accidents on the NY&NO and the RVRR ==
- September 1, 1899 — at 1:10 p.m., a Mr. Theo Harrison of Newark, New Jersey, was driving his horse-drawn wagon on Westfield Avenue when he tried to outrun the oncoming NY&NO locomotive No. 1. Mr. Harrison was thrown from the wagon and sustained a minor flesh wound on the right leg from a broken crosstie. He was later reported to be partially paralyzed.
- May 11, 1904 — William H. Harding, a conductor on the New Orange Junction Four Railroad (NY&NO), was fatally injured while coupling cars and died May 13. The accident was a result of carelessness on the part of Mr. Harding.
- March 24, 1906 — James Gray, an engineer on the Rahway Valley Railroad, lost a foot when locomotive No. 3 was struck by a coal hopper that had broken loose and ran downhill. The locomotive was scrapped after the accident.
