= Roselle Park, New Jersey =

Borough in Union County, New Jersey, US

- Borough
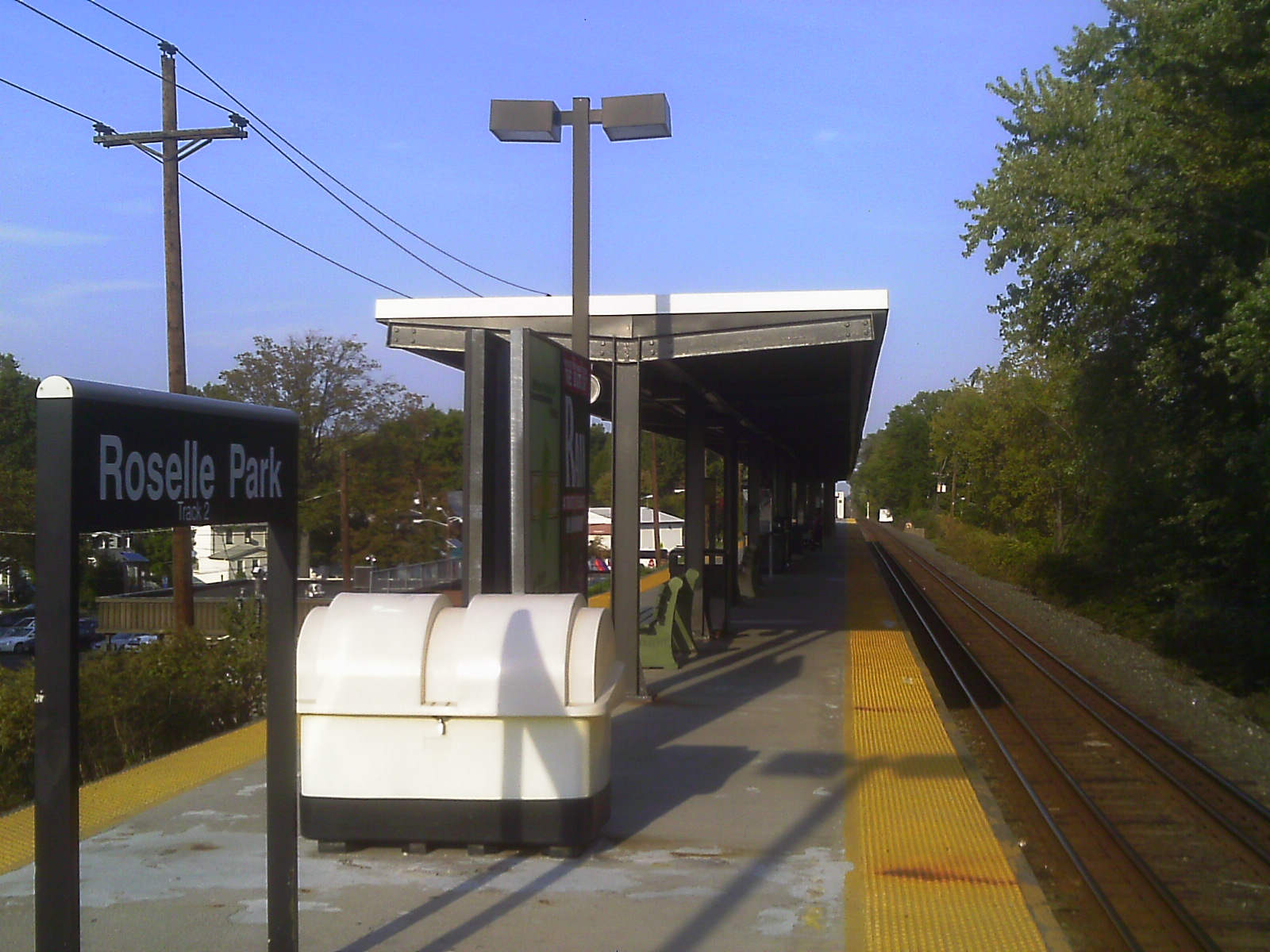
- Roselle Park train station serving New Jersey Transit passengers

- Seal

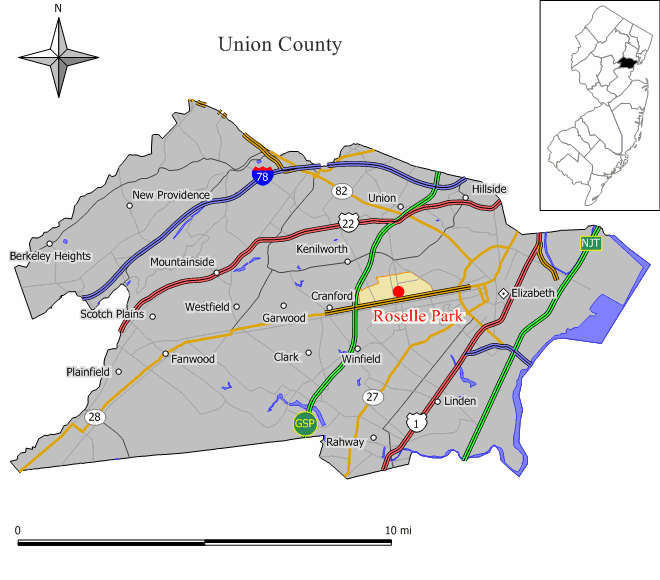
- Map of Roselle Park in Union County. Inset: Location of Union County in New Jersey.

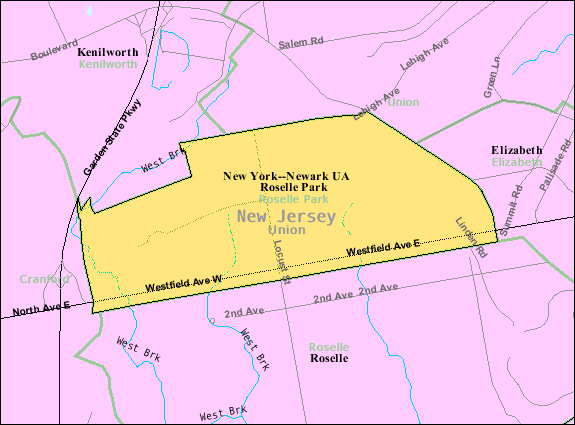
- Census Bureau map of Roselle Park, New Jersey

- Location in Union County Location in New Jersey Location in the United States
- Coordinates: 40.665309°N 74.266558°W
- Country: United States
- State: New Jersey
- County: Union
- Incorporated: March 22, 1901

Government
  - Type: Borough
  - Body: Borough Council
  - Mayor: Joseph Signorello Jr. (D, term ends December 31, 2026)
  - Business administrator / Municipal clerk: Andrew J. Casais

Area
  - Total: 1.22 sq mi (3.17 km^{2})
  - Land: 1.22 sq mi (3.17 km^{2})
  - Water: 0 sq mi (0.00 km^{2}) 0.00%
  - Rank: 482nd of 565 in state 19th of 21 in county
- Elevation: 79 ft (24 m)

Population (2020)
  - Total: 13,967
  - Estimate (2023): 13,932
  - Rank: 187th of 565 in state 14th of 21 in county
  - Density: 11,401.6/sq mi (4,402.2/km^{2})
  - Rank: 31st of 565 in state 1st of 21 in county
- Time zone: UTC−05:00 (Eastern (EST))
  - Summer (DST): UTC−04:00 (Eastern (EDT))
- ZIP Code: 07204
- Area code: 908 exchanges: 241, 245, 259, 298, 620
- FIPS code: 3403964650
- GNIS feature ID: 0885380
- Website: www.rosellepark.net

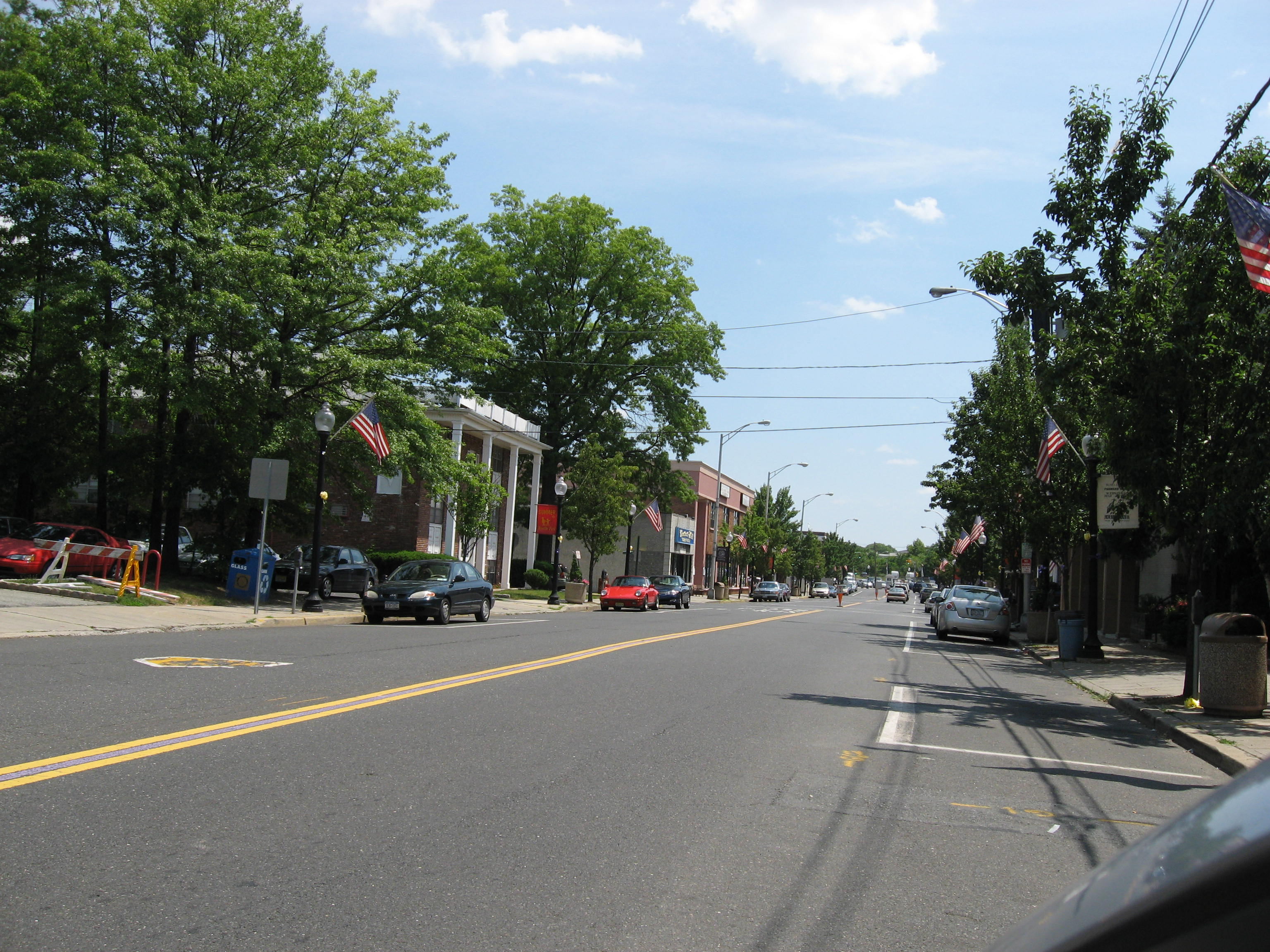
Chestnut Street

Roselle Park is a borough in Union County, in the U.S. state of New Jersey. As of the 2020 United States census, the borough's population was 13,967, an increase of 670 (+5.0%) from the 2010 census count of 13,297, which in turn reflected an increase of 16 (+0.1%) from the 13,281 counted in the 2000 census.

Roselle Park was incorporated as a borough by an act of the New Jersey Legislature on March 22, 1901, from portions of Union Township. Roselle Park's name is derived from the Roselle Land Improvement Company, which was created in 1866 to lay out a community around the Mulford Station on the Central Railroad of New Jersey. The name "Roselle" is said to have been based on the company's founder, John Conklin Rose or from John Pierre Roselle, a friend of the railroad's president.

== History ==
The first known settlement within what is now the borough was built by Samuel Williams in 1700. Galloping Hill Road was continually used by revolutionary war scouts, delivering messages to and from General George Washington and Governor Livingston. Galloping Hill Road also believed to be the route traveled by the British columns en route to the Battle of Connecticut Farms, battling the New Jersey militia the entire way. Son of American general William Crane, was bayoneted and killed by the British near what is now Galloping Hill Road and Colonial Road.

Elizabethtown & Somerville Railroad passed through in 1839, as the first railroad in Northern New Jersey. The first store in the world to be lit by electric light was Stone's Store on Westfield Avenue, lit by Thomas Edison's carbon filament prototype.

The formation of Roselle Park in 1901 occurred due to a number of grievances based on a lack of sufficient public services, including; lack of a modern sewage system, poor schools, neglected roads, and minimal public safety measures.

In 1907, the first poured concrete building in the world, now the Robert Gordon School, was built in Roselle Park using Edison's revolutionary process. Roselle Park was home to the factory and lab of Marconi Wireless Telegraph, and in late 1921 became the site of WDY, the first radio broadcasting station licensed in the state of New Jersey.

== Geography ==
According to the United States Census Bureau, the borough had a total area of 1.23 square miles (3.17 km^{2}), all of which was land.

Unincorporated communities, localities and place names located partially or completely within the borough include Lorraine.

The borough is bordered to the northeast by Union Township, to the northwest by Kenilworth, to the east by Elizabeth, to the south by Roselle and to the west by Cranford.

== Demographics ==
Historical population
Census	Pop.	Note	%±
1910	3,138		—
1920	5,438		73.3%
1930	8,969		64.9%
1940	9,661		7.7%
1950	11,537		19.4%
1960	12,546		8.7%
1970	14,277		13.8%
1980	13,377		−6.3%
1990	12,805		−4.3%
2000	13,281		3.7%
2010	13,297		0.1%
2020	13,967		5.0%
2023 (est.)	13,932	▼	−0.3%
Population sources: 1910–1920 1910–1930 1940–2000; 2000 2010 2020

=== Racial and ethnic composition ===
Roselle Park borough, Union County, New Jersey – Racial and ethnic composition Note: the US Census treats Hispanic/Latino as an ethnic category. This table excludes Latinos from the racial categories and assigns them to a separate category. Hispanics/Latinos may be of any race.
Race / Ethnicity (NH = Non-Hispanic)	Pop 2000	Pop 2010	Pop 2020	% 2000	% 2010	% 2020
White alone (NH)	9,397	7,261	5,725	70.76%	54.61%	40.99%
Black or African American alone (NH)	298	697	1,186	2.24%	5.24%	8.49%
Native American or Alaska Native alone (NH)	6	7	7	0.05%	0.05%	0.05%
Asian alone (NH)	1,199	1,337	1,271	9.03%	10.05%	9.10%
Native Hawaiian or Pacific Islander alone (NH)	1	0	1	0.01%	0.00%	0.01%
Other race alone (NH)	17	25	136	0.13%	0.19%	0.97%
Mixed race or Multiracial (NH)	193	161	348	1.45%	1.21%	2.49%
Hispanic or Latino (any race)	2,170	3,809	5,293	16.34%	28.65%	37.90%
Total	13,281	13,297	13,967	100.00%	100.00%	100.00%

=== 2020 census ===
As of the 2020 census, Roselle Park had a population of 13,967. The median age was 39.1 years. 21.4% of residents were under the age of 18 and 12.7% of residents were 65 years of age or older. For every 100 females there were 95.1 males, and for every 100 females age 18 and over there were 92.2 males age 18 and over.

100.0% of residents lived in urban areas, while 0.0% lived in rural areas.

There were 5,213 households in Roselle Park, of which 34.0% had children under the age of 18 living in them. Of all households, 47.7% were married-couple households, 18.9% were households with a male householder and no spouse or partner present, and 27.2% were households with a female householder and no spouse or partner present. About 26.8% of all households were made up of individuals and 9.0% had someone living alone who was 65 years of age or older.

There were 5,346 housing units, of which 2.5% were vacant. The homeowner vacancy rate was 0.8% and the rental vacancy rate was 2.2%.

=== 2010 census ===
The 2010 United States census counted 13,297 people, 5,002 households, and 3,406 families in the borough. The population density was 10,792.7 per square mile (4,167.1/km^{2}). There were 5,231 housing units at an average density of 4,245.8 per square mile (1,639.3/km^{2}). The racial makeup was 73.72% (9,802) White, 5.89% (783) Black or African American, 0.15% (20) Native American, 10.18% (1,354) Asian, 0.02% (2) Pacific Islander, 7.52% (1,000) from other races, and 2.53% (336) from two or more races. Hispanic or Latino of any race were 28.65% (3,809) of the population.

Of the 5,002 households, 32.3% had children under the age of 18; 49.9% were married couples living together; 13.0% had a female householder with no husband present and 31.9% were non-families. Of all households, 26.8% were made up of individuals and 8.0% had someone living alone who was 65 years of age or older. The average household size was 2.66 and the average family size was 3.28.

22.4% of the population were under the age of 18, 8.9% from 18 to 24, 29.8% from 25 to 44, 27.7% from 45 to 64, and 11.2% who were 65 years of age or older. The median age was 37.9 years. For every 100 females, the population had 95.0 males. For every 100 females ages 18 and older there were 92.0 males.

The Census Bureau's 2006–2010 American Community Survey showed that (in 2010 inflation-adjusted dollars) median household income was $61,923 (with a margin of error of +/− $5,415) and the median family income was $75,017 (+/− $8,553). Males had a median income of $50,502 (+/− $5,243) versus $41,193 (+/− $5,261) for females. The per capita income for the borough was $30,566 (+/− $2,011). About 3.6% of families and 5.1% of the population were below the poverty line, including 9.0% of those under age 18 and 1.9% of those age 65 or over.

=== 2000 census ===
As of the 2000 United States census there were 13,281 people, 5,137 households, and 3,416 families residing in the borough. The population density was 10,855.7 inhabitants per square mile (4,191.4/km^{2}). There were 5,258 housing units at an average density of 4,297.8 per square mile (1,659.4/km^{2}). The racial makeup of the borough was 80.87% White, 2.42% African American, 0.11% Native American, 9.14% Asian, 0.02% Pacific Islander, 4.89% from other races, and 2.55% from two or more races. Hispanic or Latino of any race were 16.34% of the population.

There were 5,137 households, out of which 30.1% had children under the age of 18 living with them, 50.8% were married couples living together, 11.2% had a female householder with no husband present, and 33.5% were non-families. 28.2% of all households were made up of individuals, and 8.5% had someone living alone who was 65 years of age or older. The average household size was 2.58 and the average family size was 3.22.

In the borough the population was spread out, with 22.2% under the age of 18, 8.8% from 18 to 24, 33.5% from 25 to 44, 22.8% from 45 to 64, and 12.6% who were 65 years of age or older. The median age was 37 years. For every 100 females, there were 95.0 males. For every 100 females age 18 and over, there were 91.4 males.

The median income for a household in the borough was $53,717, and the median income for a family was $63,403. Males had a median income of $42,623 versus $33,105 for females. The per capita income for the borough was $24,101. About 3.4% of families and 4.3% of the population were below the poverty line, including 6.3% of those under age 18 and 1.6% of those age 65 or over.

== Government ==
=== Local government ===
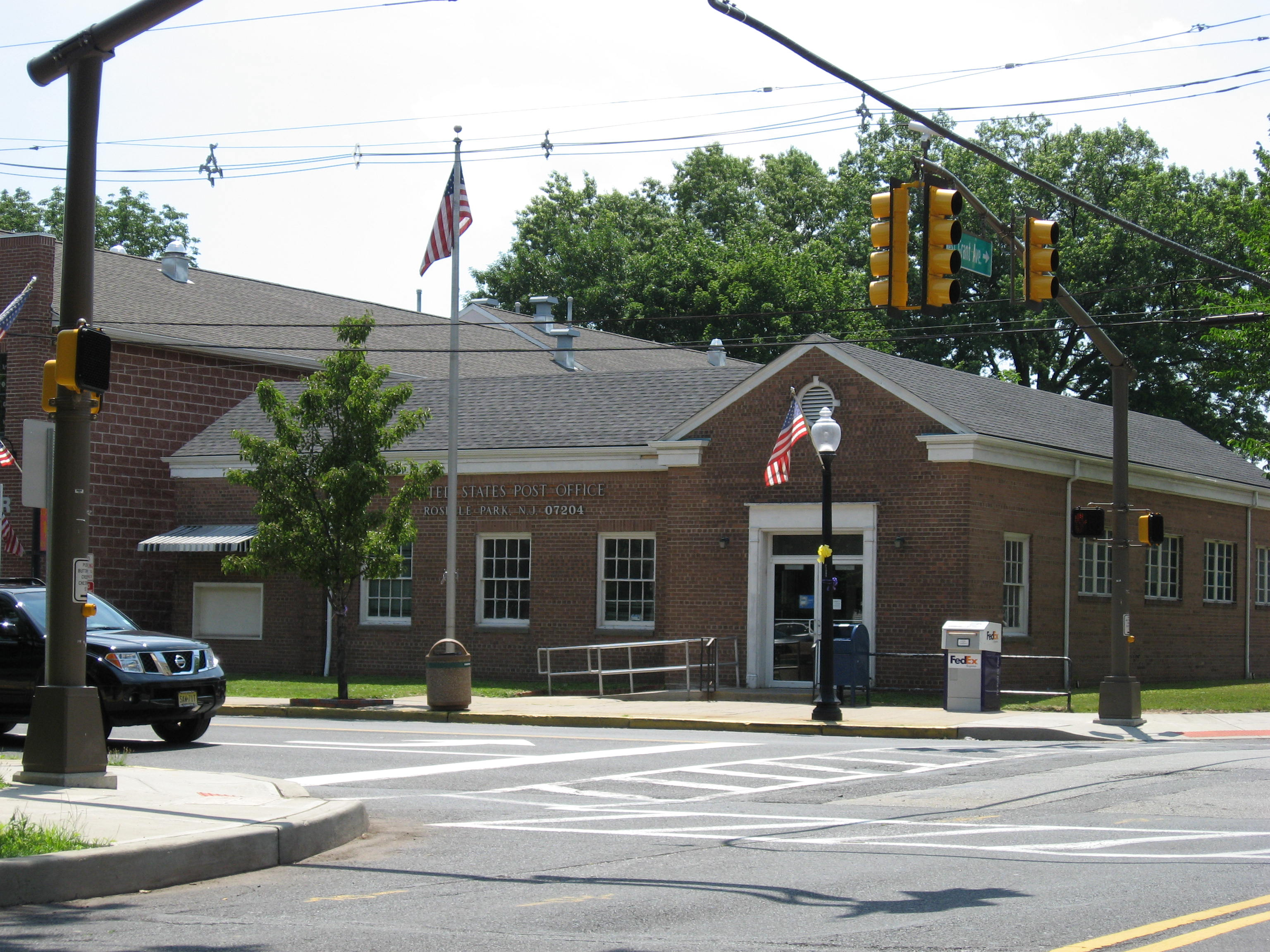
Post Office

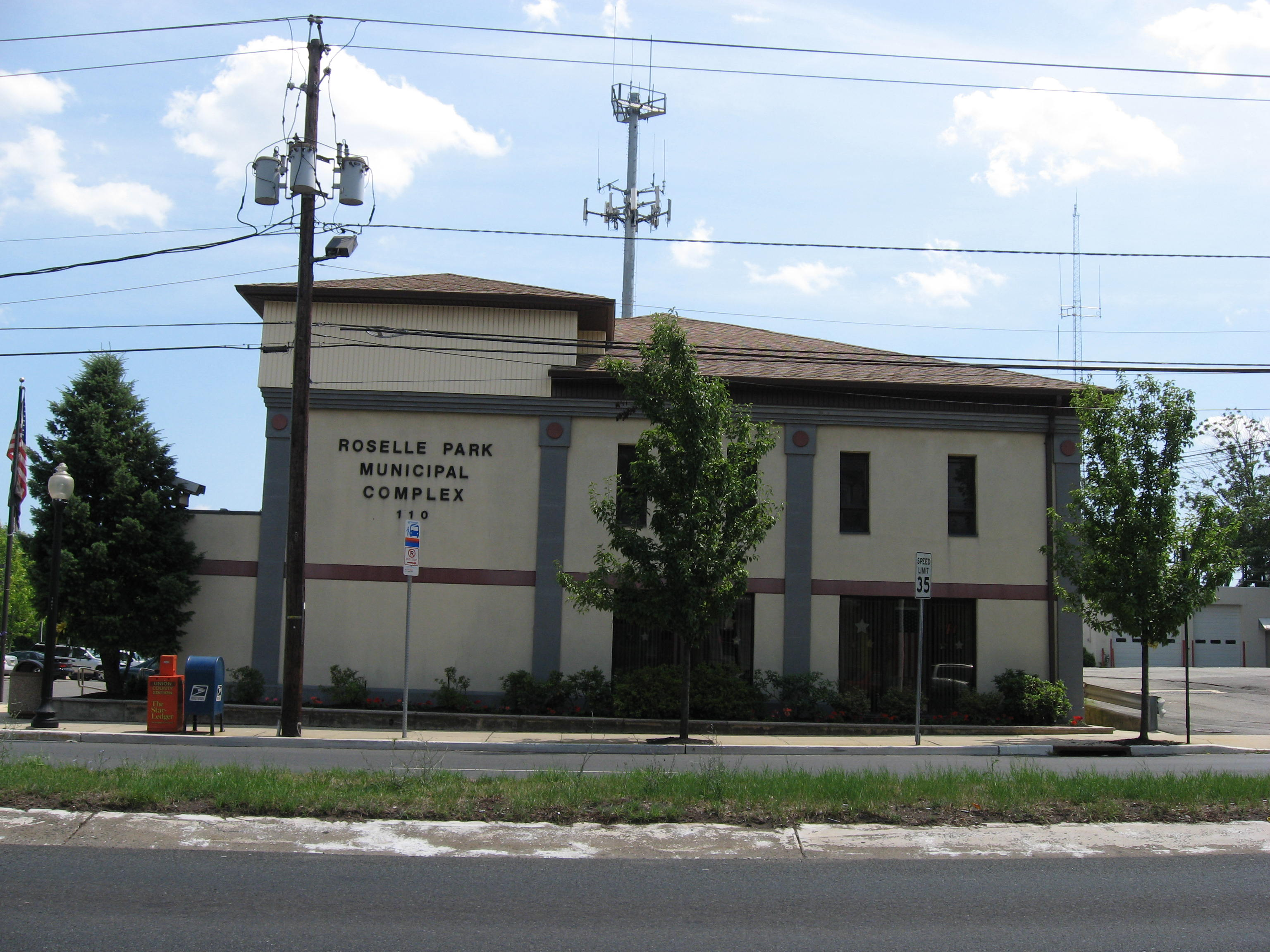
Municipal Complex

The Borough of Roselle Park is governed under the borough form of New Jersey municipal government, which is used in 218 municipalities (of the 564) statewide, making it the most common form of government in New Jersey. The governing body is comprised of the mayor and the borough council, with all positions elected on a partisan basis as part of the November general election. The mayor is elected directly by the voters to a four-year term of office. The borough council includes six members elected to serve three-year terms on a staggered basis, with two seats coming up for election each year in a three-year cycle. Roselle Park is divided into five election districts, referred to as wards. One councilperson is elected from each ward, and one councilperson is elected from the borough at-large, with two council seats up for election each year for three-year terms of office. Roselle Park is one of only two boroughs statewide that use wards (the other is Roselle). The borough form of government used by Roselle Park is a "weak mayor / strong council" government in which council members act as the legislative body with the mayor presiding at meetings and voting only in the event of a tie. The mayor can veto ordinances subject to an override by a two-thirds majority vote of the council. The mayor makes committee and liaison assignments for council members, and most appointments are made by the mayor with the advice and consent of the council.

As of 2026, the mayor of Roselle Park is Democrat Joseph Signorello Jr., appointed to an unexpired term of office ending December 31, 2026. Members of the Borough Council are Council President Rosanna Antonuccio-Lyons (Ward 3; D, 2028), Gregory Johnson (Ward 1; D, 2026), Khanjan Patel (Ward 4; R, 2028), Joseph Petrosky (Ward 2; D, 2027), Jay Robaina (Ward 5; D, 2027) and Jorge Casalins (At-large; D, appointed to an unexpired term ending 2026).

When former mayor and newly elected councilman-at-large Joe DeIorio was sworn into office in January 2018, serving with his husband Fifth Ward Councilman Thos Shipley, they became the first openly gay married couple to serve elected public office together for the same municipality.

On December 4, 2015, Councilwoman Charlene Storey announced that she would resign from here seat effective January 7, 2016, due to her opposition to the council's decision to rename the annual ceremony from "The Tree Lighting" to "The Christmas Tree Lighting", citing issues of establishment of a preferred religion. However, the next day, Storey and Mayor Hokanson reached an agreement stating that Storey would rescind her resignation and that she would chair a committee on diversity in the borough. In August 2016, Storey became an unaffiliated voter after being removed by the Democratic Committee; In January 2017, Eugene Meola switched his voter registration from Democratic to unaffiliated.

In January 2015, Joseph Petrosky was chosen by the borough council from among three candidates offered by the municipal Democratic committee to fill the Second Ward seat vacated by Charlene Storey when she took office to fill the at-large seat.

In the wake of charges that he had stolen campaign signs from a neighbor's lawn, Fifth Ward Michael Yakubov announced in January 2015 that he would be resigning from office in March. Richard Templeton was selected by three candidate nominated by the Republican municipal committee and appointed to Yakubov's vacant seat in March 2015, before switching parties and becoming a Democrat five days after he took office.

On November 3, 2015, Republican Thos Shipley bested incumbent Rich Templeton by 60% of the vote On January 7, 2016, Thos Shipley made Borough history twice as the first African American and the first openly gay member of the governing body sworn into office. Councilman Shipley is also married to former 16-year Mayor Joseph DeIorio, the longest-serving mayor in Borough history.

=== Federal, state and county representation ===
Roselle Park is located in the 10th Congressional District and is part of New Jersey's 22nd state legislative district.

For the 119th United States Congress, New Jersey's 10th congressional district is represented by LaMonica McIver (D, Newark). New Jersey is represented in the United States Senate by Democrats Cory Booker (Newark, term ends 2027) and Andy Kim (Moorestown, term ends 2031).

For the 2026–2027 session, the 22nd legislative district of the New Jersey Legislature is represented in the State Senate by Nicholas Scutari (D, Linden) and in the General Assembly by Linda S. Carter (D, Plainfield) and James J. Kennedy (D, Rahway).

Union County is governed by a Board of County Commissioners, whose nine members are elected at-large to three-year terms of office on a staggered basis with three seats coming up for election each year, with an appointed County Manager overseeing the day-to-day operations of the county. At an annual reorganization meeting held in the beginning of January, the board selects a Chair and Vice Chair from among its members. As of 2026, Union County's County Commissioners are:

Vice Chair Rebecca Williams (D, Plainfield, 2028), Chairman Joesph Bodek (D, Linden, 2026), James E. Baker Jr. (D, Rahway, 2027), Michele Delisfort (D, Union Township, 2026), Lourdes M. Leon (D, Elizabeth, 2026), Alexander Mirabella (D, Fanwood, 2027) Kimberly Palmieri-Mouded (D, Westfield, 2027). Stanley J. Neron (D, Elizabeth, 2028), Joseph Signorello III (D, Roselle Park, 2028)

Constitutional officers elected on a countywide basis are: Clerk Vacant - Incumbent Clerk Joanne Rajoppi (D, Union Township) died on July 16, 2026. Her death triggered a special election for a full five-year term to be held concurrently with the November 2026 general election. Deputy Clerk Clara Fernández assumes the powers of the office until the vacancy is filled. Sheriff Peter Corvelli (D, Kenilworth, 2026) and Surrogate Christopher E. Hudak (D, Clark, 2027).

=== Politics ===
As of March 2011, there were a total of 7,525 registered voters in Roselle Park, of which 2,325 (30.9% vs. 41.8% countywide) were registered as Democrats, 1,279 (17.0% vs. 15.3%) were registered as Republicans and 3,918 (52.1% vs. 42.9%) were registered as Unaffiliated. There were 3 voters registered as Libertarians or Greens. Among the borough's 2010 Census population, 56.6% (vs. 53.3% in Union County) were registered to vote, including 72.9% of those ages 18 and over (vs. 70.6% countywide).

United States presidential election results for Roselle Park
Year	Republican		Democratic		Third party(ies)	
Year	No.	%	No.	%	No.	%
2024	2,807	45.09%	3,287	52.79%	132	2.12%
2020	2,633	39.88%	3,882	58.80%	87	1.32%
2016	2,278	40.46%	3,166	56.23%	186	3.30%
2012	1,931	38.09%	3,064	60.43%	75	1.48%
2008	2,530	44.32%	3,083	54.00%	96	1.68%
2004	2,619	48.37%	2,753	50.84%	43	0.79%

In the 2012 presidential election, Democrat Barack Obama received 60.4% of the vote (3,064 cast), ahead of Republican Mitt Romney with 38.1% (1,931 votes), and other candidates with 1.5% (75 votes), among the 5,117 ballots cast by the borough's 7,841 registered voters (47 ballots were spoiled), for a turnout of 65.3%. In the 2012 presidential election, Democrat Barack Obama received 3,064 votes (59.9% vs. 66.0% countywide), ahead of Republican Mitt Romney with 1,931 votes (37.7% vs. 32.3%) and other candidates with 75 votes (1.5% vs. 0.8%), among the 5,117 ballots cast by the borough's 7,841 registered voters, for a turnout of 65.3% (vs. 68.8% in Union County). In the 2008 presidential election, Democrat Barack Obama received 3,083 votes (53.5% vs. 63.1% countywide), ahead of Republican John McCain with 2,530 votes (43.9% vs. 35.2%) and other candidates with 96 votes (1.7% vs. 0.9%), among the 5,759 ballots cast by the borough's 7,953 registered voters, for a turnout of 72.4% (vs. 74.7% in Union County). In the 2004 presidential election, Democrat John Kerry received 2,753 votes (50.6% vs. 58.3% countywide), ahead of Republican George W. Bush with 2,619 votes (48.1% vs. 40.3%) and other candidates with 43 votes (0.8% vs. 0.7%), among the 5,443 ballots cast by the borough's 7,773 registered voters, for a turnout of 70.0% (vs. 72.3% in the whole county).

Gubernatorial election results for Roselle Park
Year	Republican		Democratic		Third party(ies)	
Year	No.	%	No.	%	No.	%
2025	1,735	36.89%	2,929	62.28%	39	0.83%
2021	1,562	45.97%	1,800	52.97%	36	1.06%
2017	1,223	39.63%	1,789	57.97%	74	2.40%
2013	1,610	56.63%	1,183	41.61%	50	1.76%
2009	1,700	50.09%	1,404	41.37%	290	8.54%
2005	1,623	45.34%	1,842	51.45%	115	3.21%

In the 2017 gubernatorial election, Democrat Phil Murphy received 1,789 votes (58.0% vs. 65.2% countywide), ahead of Republican Kim Guadagno with 1,223 votes (39.6% vs. 32.6%), and other candidates with 74 votes (2.4% vs. 2.1%), among the 3,249 ballots cast by the borough's 8,344 registered voters, for a turnout of 38.9%. In the 2013 gubernatorial election, Republican Chris Christie received 56.6% of the vote (1,610 cast), ahead of Democrat Barbara Buono with 41.6% (1,183 votes), and other candidates with 1.8% (50 votes), among the 2,923 ballots cast by the borough's 7,676 registered voters (80 ballots were spoiled), for a turnout of 38.1%. In the 2009 gubernatorial election, Republican Chris Christie received 1,700 votes (49.2% vs. 41.7% countywide), ahead of Democrat Jon Corzine with 1,404 votes (40.6% vs. 50.6%), Independent Chris Daggett with 249 votes (7.2% vs. 5.9%) and other candidates with 41 votes (1.2% vs. 0.8%), among the 3,455 ballots cast by the borough's 7,711 registered voters, yielding a 44.8% turnout (vs. 46.5% in the county).

United States Senate election results for Roselle Park1
Year	Republican		Democratic		Third party(ies)	
Year	No.	%	No.	%	No.	%
2024	2,331	41.89%	3,079	55.33%	155	2.79%
2018	1,713	38.37%	2,358	52.81%	394	8.82%
2012	1,588	35.59%	2,763	61.92%	111	2.49%
2006	1,839	47.54%	1,962	50.72%	67	1.73%

United States Senate election results for Roselle Park2
Year	Republican		Democratic		Third party(ies)	
Year	No.	%	No.	%	No.	%
2020	2,366	36.95%	3,863	60.32%	175	2.73%
2014	1,191	39.87%	1,720	57.58%	76	2.54%
2013	735	47.24%	802	51.54%	19	1.22%
2008	1,995	41.93%	2,618	55.02%	145	3.05%

== Education ==
The Roselle Park School District serves public school students in pre-kindergarten through twelfth grade. As of the 2023–24 school year, the district, comprised of five schools, had an enrollment of 2,033 students and 170.6 classroom teachers (on an FTE basis), for a student–teacher ratio of 11.9:1. Schools in the district (with 2023–24 enrollment data from the National Center for Education Statistics) are Ernest J. Finizio Aldene Elementary School with 263 students in grades PreK–5, Robert Gordon Elementary School with 311 students in grades PreK–5, Sherman Elementary School with 357 students in grades K–5, Roselle Park Middle School with 443 students in grades 6–8 and Roselle Park High School with 641 students in grades 9–12.

== Library ==
The Roselle Park Veterans Memorial Library was renamed in the early 1980s in honor of the veterans of Roselle Park. The library currently has more than 10,000 square feet (930 m^{2}) of space used to store traditional books in addition to computers, books on tape, videos, CD's, Meeting Room, information center, pictures, and music tapes. The library offers a photocopier and fax service and allows its patrons to reserve and renew materials over the phone and online. The library offers free Wi-Fi access.

The Veterans Memorial Library offers an array of events such as charity projects, book discussions, and a Book of the Month Club. The Veterans Memorial Library also caters to children and young teens with many different events. Events such as Homework Help, No Bullying Resources, and Crazy For Crafts, among other things, are offered free of charge and children are encouraged to participate.

== Parks and recreation ==
=== Roselle Park RVRR rail trail ===
Lines of the abandoned Rahway Valley Railroad

Area residents have proposed a 7.3-mile (11.7 km) pedestrian linear park along the main line of the abandoned Rahway Valley Railroad that would run through Roselle Park. The rail trail would run eastbound from Overlook Medical Center on the edge of downtown Summit and head south through Springfield, Union, over Route 22 to Kenilworth and end at the southwest edge of Roselle Park at the Cranford border. A northern portion of the rail trail on the RVRR main line is under construction as the Summit Park Line, with a footbridge over Morris Avenue installed in October 2022. In parallel, advocates have been pushing for immediate development of the portion of the RVRR Main Line south of Route 22, running past the Galloping Hill Golf Course through Kenilworth and Roselle Park. The New Jersey Department of Transportation, which owns the railbed, has been working to clear it in anticipation of possible future trail use for pedestrians and cyclists.

== Transportation ==
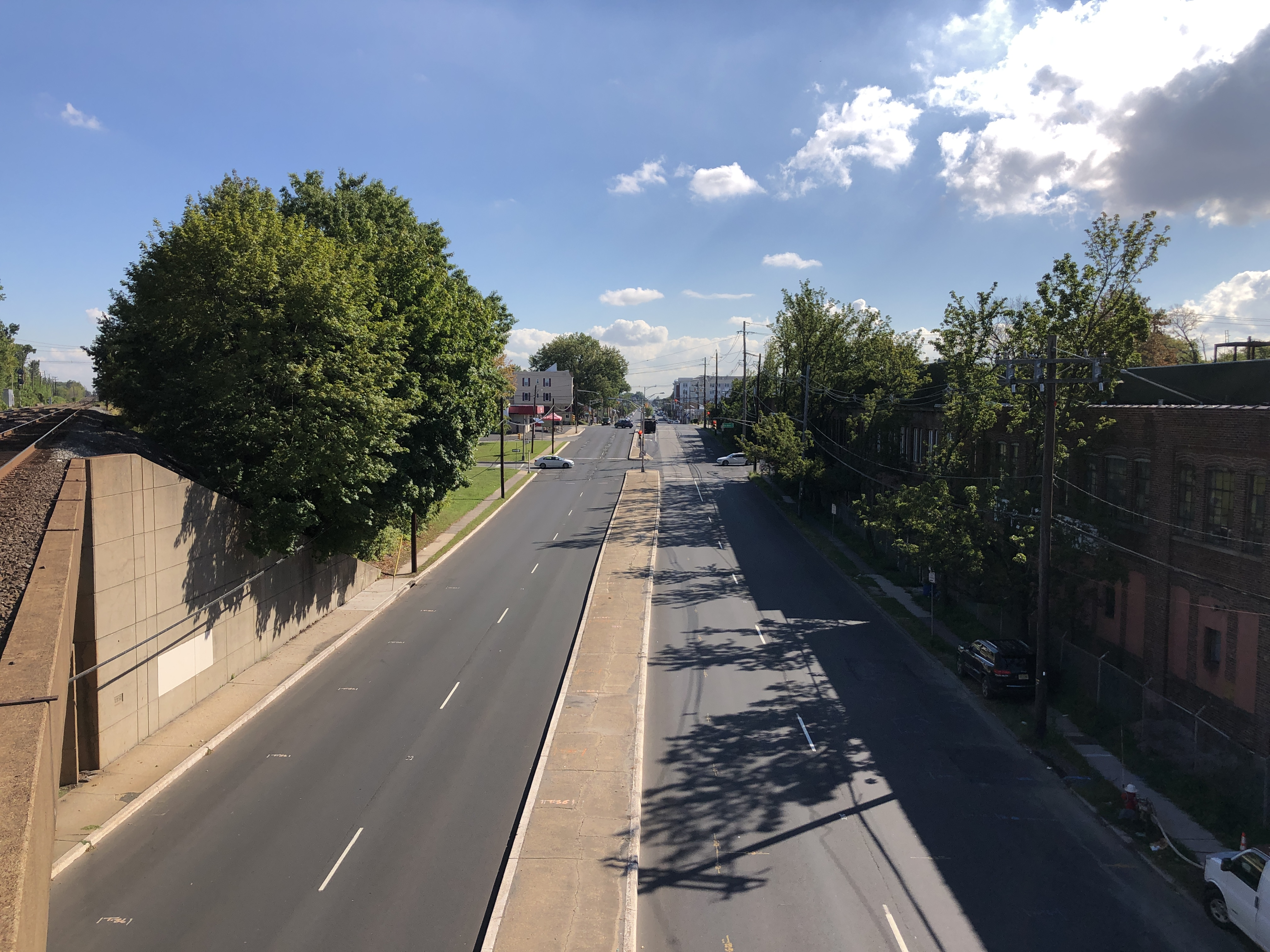
Route 28 eastbound in Roselle Park

=== Roads and highways ===
As of May 2010, the borough had a total of 27.48 miles (44.22 km) of roadways, of which 23.20 miles (37.34 km) were maintained by the municipality, 2.32 miles (3.73 km) by Union County and 1.96 miles (3.15 km) by the New Jersey Department of Transportation.

Route 28 passes through Roselle Park. The Garden State Parkway passes just beyond the western boundary of the borough.

=== Public transportation ===
NJ Transit provides service on bus routes 58 route with service from Elizabeth to Kenilworth, 94 to Newark and 113 to the Port Authority Bus Terminal in New York City.

Newark Liberty International Airport is approximately 10 minutes away. Linden Airport, a general aviation facility, is in nearby Linden.

The Roselle Park station offers NJ Transit commuter rail service as part of its Raritan Valley Line service. This was a result of the Aldene Connection that opened in Roselle Park on April 30, 1967, between tracks of the Central Railroad of New Jersey and the Lehigh Valley Railroad, allowing passengers to travel directly to Newark Penn Station and change there for trains to New York Penn Station, rather than riding to Jersey City and taking ferries into Manhattan. In January 2015, New Jersey Transit began Raritan Valley service directly to New York Penn Station through the use of dual-powered diesel and overhead electric ALP-45DP locomotives. Currently the Roselle Park station is located at milepost 16.0 on the Conrail Lehigh Line, on the corner of Chestnut Street and West Lincoln Avenue; the same location as the original Lehigh Valley station. In addition to local travel, one can take the train to Newark or New York and connect to various modes of travel to nearly anywhere in the U.S. and Canada.

=== Railroad history ===
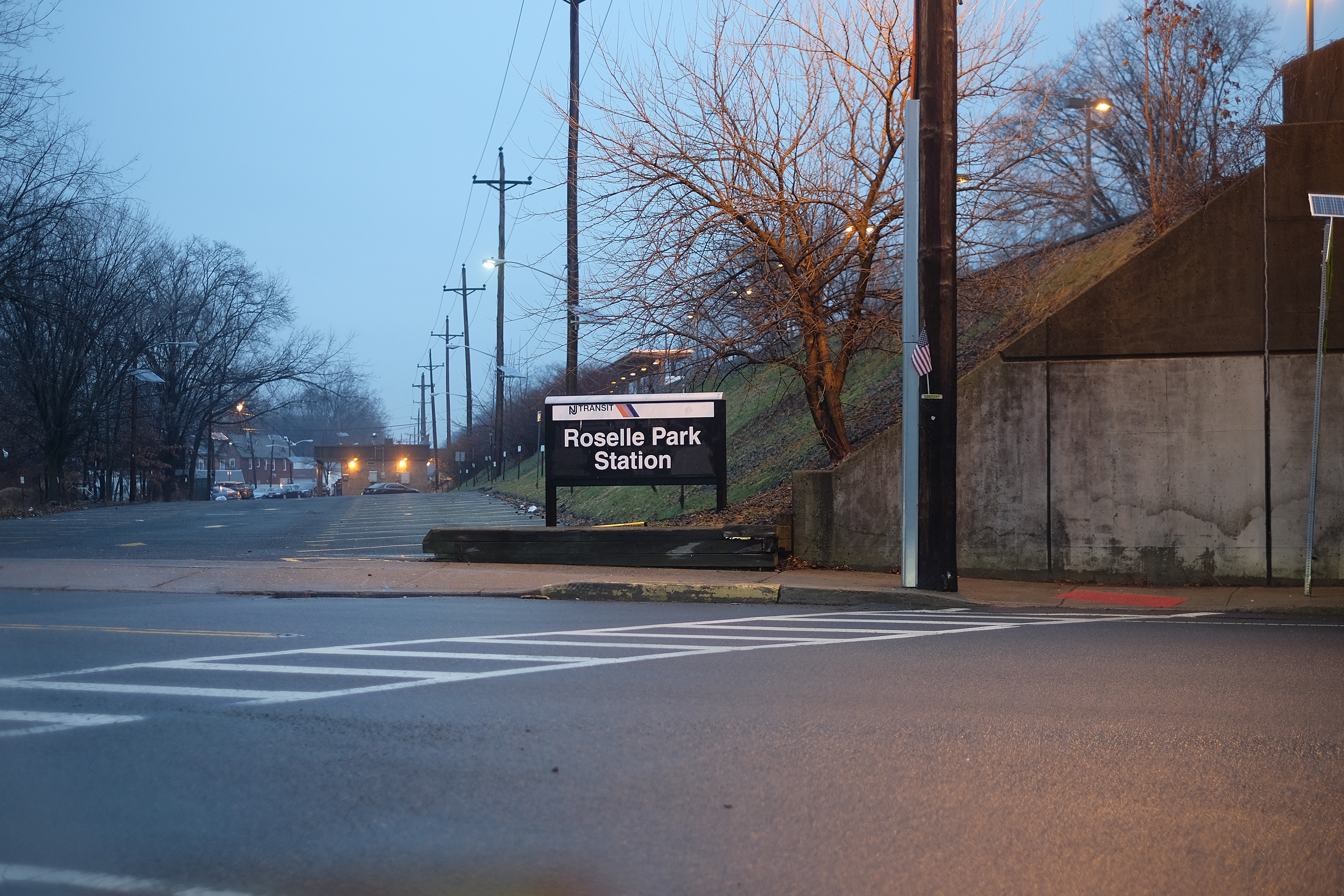
Roselle Park Train station entrance on Locust Street

Roselle Park has a railroading heritage, with a steam locomotive on the borough seal, and the town is accessible to railroad enthusiasts.

The Elizabethtown & Somerville railway began laying rails through what would become Roselle Park in 1839. It eventually became the Central Railroad of New Jersey between Jersey City, New Jersey, and Scranton, Pennsylvania. Throughout the years as traffic grew, the line would grow to four main tracks, and also offered trains of Reading Company and the Baltimore and Ohio Railroad.

Competition would come as the Lehigh Coal and Navigation Company realized that railroading was a more efficient mode of transportation for their coal than a canal system. They formed the Lehigh Valley Railroad, and began building eastward in 1853. By 1872, they had reached Roselle, and formed the subsidiary Newark and Roselle Railway in order to continue building east to the Hudson River.

Roselle Park and Roselle formerly shared a rail station on the CNJ mainline. Passenger service east of Bayonne ended on April 30, 1967. Shuttle service between Bayonne and Cranford continued on until August 1978 but eventually ended, resulting in the closure of the old station on Chestnut Street. The line continued to see operation as an access route to the NJTransit/NJDOT railroad shops at Elizabethport until the mid-1980s. It is currently in service and used, as the Conrail Shared Assets Elizabeth Industrial Track and serves several local industries.

On April 1, 1976, the Lehigh Valley Railroad became part of the Consolidated Rail Corporation (Conrail) and became known as the "Lehigh Line". On June 1, 1999, Conrail was purchased and split between Norfolk Southern (58%) and CSX (42%), and became "shared assets". Conrail continues to operate the Lehigh Line between Newark and Manville for Norfolk Southern and CSX. In addition to NJ Transit, the line sees anywhere from 35-45 freight trains per day from three railroads; Conrail, Norfolk Southern, and CSX. Canadian Pacific (formerly Delaware and Hudson Railway) utilized trackage rights into Oak Island Yard in Newark until 2012. The track is Norfolk Southern's primary access on their northern transcontinental route into and out of the New York City metropolitan area, and is also part of CSX's primary north–south corridor between New England and Jacksonville, Florida.

The borough was once served by the Rahway Valley Railroad. The line was exempted in 1991 by then Rahway Valley Railroad controller Delaware Otsego Corporation, and was given to the County of Union. It has remained dormant since. However, beginning in 2004, the Union County Board of Chosen Freeholders began taking steps to reactivate the routes. They named the Morristown and Erie Railway as designated operator and funded the beginning of right-of-way renewal, though the project has faced opposition from residents who incorrectly believed that the line would be used to transport trash. All funding for the project was spent on litigation with opponents. Currently the Morristown and Erie Railway is awaiting further funding to complete the work. As of 2011, the project was halted and no further steps were being taken to reactivate the railway. As of 2022, local residents have been advocating for conversion to a pedestrian rail trail.

== Notable people ==
People who were born in, residents of, or otherwise closely associated with Roselle Park include:

- Michael Ausiello (born 1972), TV Guide writer
- Rick Barry (born 1944), NBA All-Pro forward who was ranked #2 on the Sports Illustrated list of The 50 Greatest New Jersey Sports Figures
- Frank R. Burns (1928–2012), American football player and coach, who was head coach of the Rutgers Scarlet Knights from 1973 to 1982
- Mike Daly, producer / songwriter / multi-instrumentalist
- Gregory Gillespie (1936–2000), artist
- Edmund Kara (1925–2001), fashion illustrator and designer, interior designer, and sculptor on the Big Sur coast of California
- Adam Lakomy (born 2006), artistic gymnast who is the 2024 Junior Pan American champion
- Keith Loneker (1971–2017), former professional football player and actor
- Marisa Acocella Marchetto (born 1962), cartoonist and author of the New York Times best-selling graphic novel Ann Tenna, the graphic memoir Cancer Vixen and Just Who the Hell is She, Anyway?
- John Morrison (born 1945), former professional basketball player who played in the American Basketball Association for the Denver Rockets
- Francis M. Nevins (born 1943), mystery writer, attorney, and professor of law
- James J. Norris (1907–1976), advocate for refugees and migrants who was the first president of the International Catholic Migration Commission
- Chris Ostrowsky (born c. 1970), college football coach who has been offensive coordinator and quarterbacks coach for the Yale Bulldogs football team since 2023
- Alan Pasqua (born 1952), pianist, composer and jazz musician
- Dick Sweeney, businessman and co-founder of Keurig, developer of the K-Cup single coffee brewing system
