= Galloping Hill Golf Course =

Golf course in New Jersey, US

Coordinates: 40.684336°N 74.276432°W

- Interactive map of Galloping Hill Golf Course

Club information
- Location: Kenilworth and Union, Union County, New Jersey, U.S.
- Established: 1928
- Type: Public
- Tota holes: 18
- Website: gallopinghillgolfcourse.com
- Designed by: Willard G. Wilkinson

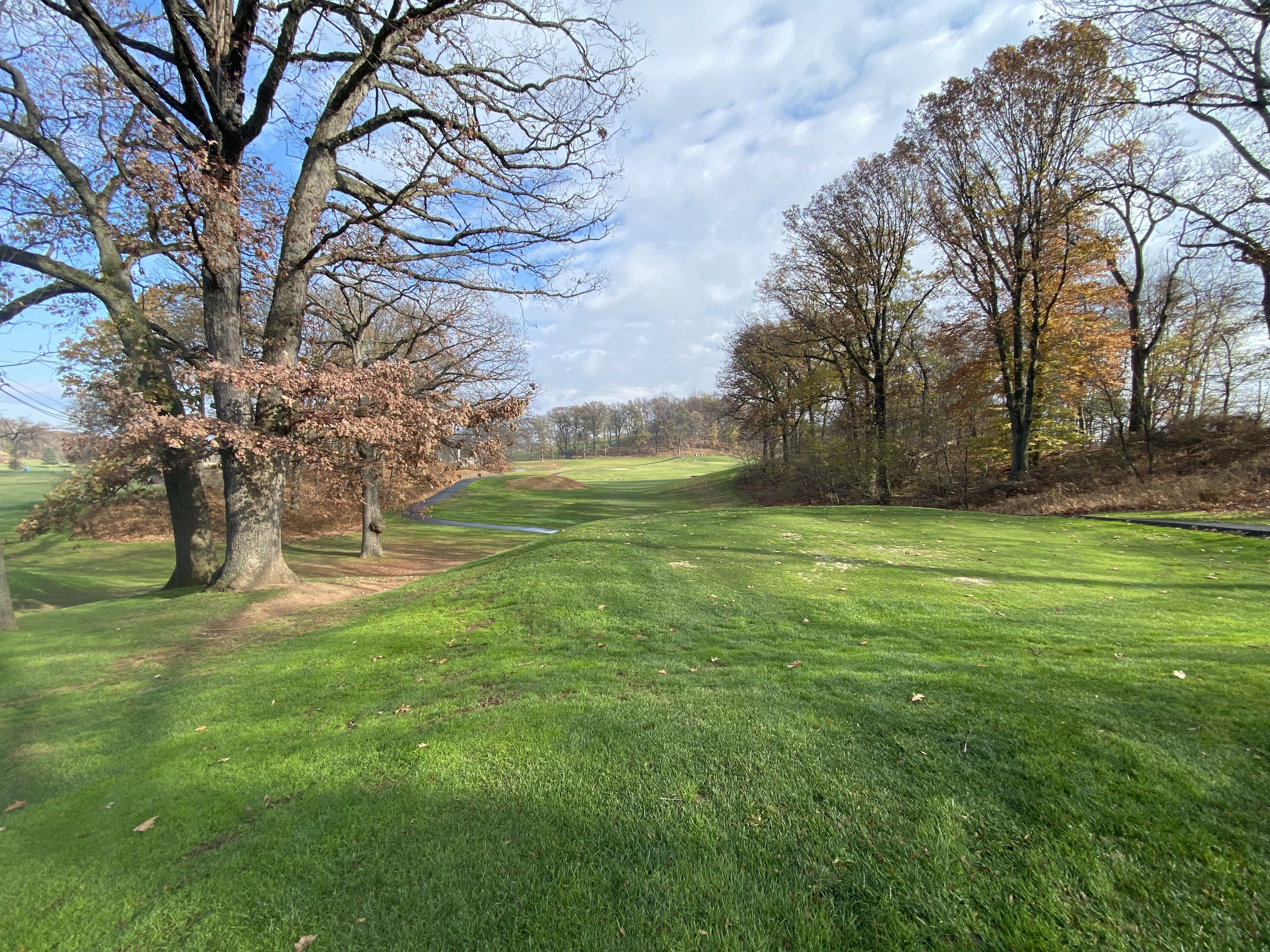
Galloping Hill Golf Course in November 2022

Galloping Hill Golf Course is a golf course in Kenilworth, New Jersey, with part of the course located in Union Township, New Jersey. It was designed by Willard G. Wilkinson in 1928, who had previously worked for A. W. Tillinghast's firm, and was subsequently renovated by Robert Trent Jones in 1949; Alfred Tull in 1953; Stephen Kay in 1998 and Rees Jones in 2013. A new bar, restaurant, reception facilities, and clubhouse were built as part of an extensive remodeling to the course in 2013.

The New Jersey State Golf Association moved its headquarters to the club in recent years.

In 2016, it became the first New Jersey State Open held on a public course in 95 years. It offers golf lessons and various year-round state-of-the-art golf training facilities including a 9 hole practice course, 52 driving stalls (20 with heat and protection from elements), 46,000 square feet of chipping/putting practice areas, and practice bunkers.

According to the Federal Writers' Project's WPA Guide (1939), "the club occupies the low, rounded peak of Galloping Hill, so named because of the British military dispatch riders who galloped on the road here [during the American Revolutionary War, which was] an unusual sight for farmers who walked their horses on the steep hill."

The ghost of a headless Hessian horseman is said to roam the links. At least one ghosthunter has suggested that stories of the Galloping Hill Headless Horseman may have inspired Washington Irving to write The Legend of Sleepy Hollow (1820).

== Rail trail at Galloping Hill ==
Area residents have proposed a 7.3-mile pedestrian linear park along the main line of the abandoned Rahway Valley Railroad. The rail trail would run eastbound from the medical center on the edge of downtown Summit and head south along the old railbed through Springfield, Union, Kenilworth and ending at the southwest edge of Roselle Park at the Cranford border. A northern portion of the rail trail on the RVRR main line is under construction as the Summit Park Line, with a footbridge over Morris Avenue installed in October 2022. In parallel, advocates have been pushing for immediate development of the portion south of Route 22, running past the golf course, with views of same, through Kenilworth and Roselle Park. The New Jersey Department of Transportation, which owns the railbed, has been working to clear it in anticipation of possible future trail use.
