= Gregory Gillespie =

American painter (1936–2000)

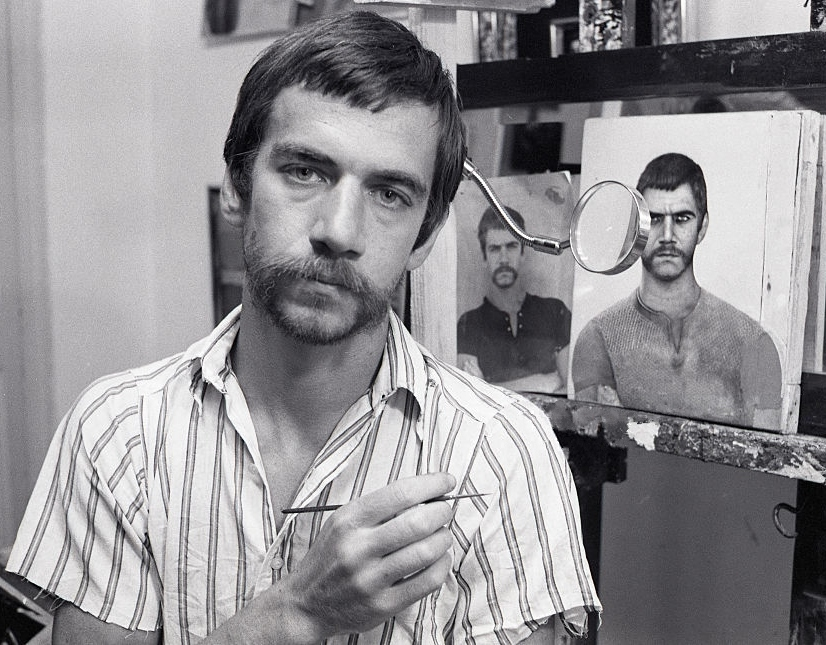
- Gillespie with self-portrait in his Rome studio, c. 1969
- Born: Gregory Joseph Gillespie; November 29, 1936; Roselle Park, New Jersey, U.S.
- Died: April 26, 2000 (aged 63); Belchertown, Massachusetts, U.S.
- Education: San Francisco Art Institute
- Known for: Painting

Gregory Joseph Gillespie (November 29, 1936 – April 26, 2000) was an American magic realist painter.

== Life and career ==
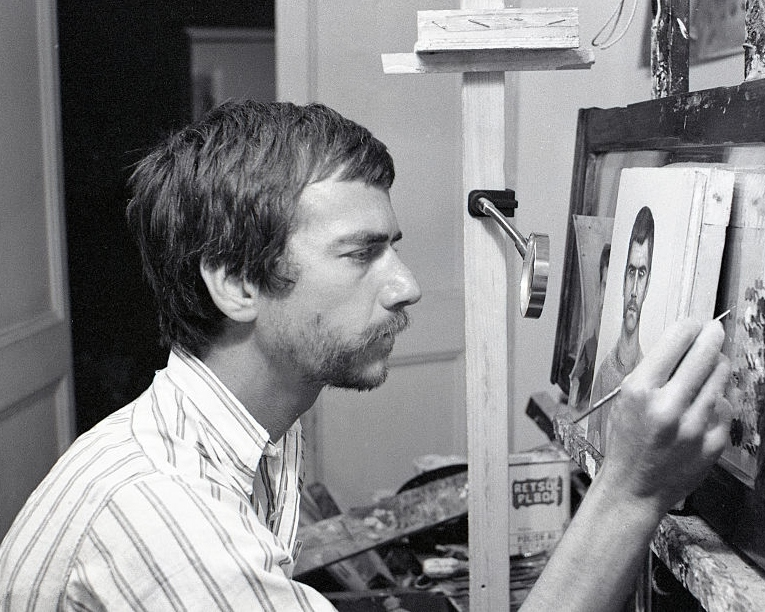
Gillespie with self-portrait in his Rome studio c. 1969

Gillespie was born in Roselle Park, New Jersey. After graduating from high school, he became a nondegree student at Cooper Union in New York. In 1959 Gillespie married Frances Cohen (1939–1998), who was also an artist, and the following year they moved to San Francisco where Gillespie studied at the San Francisco Art Institute.

In 1962, Gillespie received the first of two Fulbright-Hays grants for travel to Italy to study the work of Masaccio. He lived and worked in Florence for two years and in Rome for six years, studying the works of such Renaissance masters as Carpaccio, Mantegna, and Carlo Crivelli, who was a particular favorite of Gillespie. During this time, Gillespie was awarded three Chester Dale Fellowships and a Louis Comfort Tiffany grant. In 1971, he was elected into the National Academy of Design as an Associate member and became a full Academician in 1994.

Gillespie had his first solo show in 1966, at the Forum Gallery in New York. In 1970 he returned to the United States, where he settled in Williamsburg, Massachusetts. He exhibited in several Whitney Biennials, and in 1977 the Hirshhorn Museum organized a touring retrospective of his work.

Gillespie became known for meticulously painted figurative paintings, landscapes, and self portraits, often with a fantastical element. Many of his early works were made by painting over photographs cut from newspapers or magazines, transforming the scenes through photographic collage, and by adding imaginary elements. In his later work, Gillespie abandoned his early fascination with creating hyper-realized realistic imagery, instead focusing on a looser and more expressive style. He often combined media in an unorthodox way to create shrine-like assemblages. In 1983, Gillespie and his first wife, Frances, divorced.

Gillespie was found dead by his second wife, Peggy, in his studio in Belchertown, Massachusetts, apparently a suicide by hanging, on April 26, 2000.

In December 2022, Gillespie's son, Vincent, a resident of Athol, Massachusetts, was found guilty of assaulting law enforcement during the January 6 United States Capitol attack. Prior to his conviction, Vincent Gillespie had waged a lengthy legal battle against his stepmother to gain control of his father's paintings.

== Collections ==
Gillespie's work is in the collections of the Whitney Museum, the Arkansas Arts Center, and the Butler Institute of American Art, among others. The Hirshhorn Museum has at least fourteen works by Gillespie in its collection (see external links).

== General and cited references ==
- Lerner, Abram (1977). Gregory Gillespie. Washington: [Published for the] Hirshhorn Museum and Sculpture Garden, Smithsonian Institution, by Smithsonian Institution Press. OCLC 3397187
