= Kenilworth, New Jersey =

Borough in Union County, New Jersey, US

- Borough
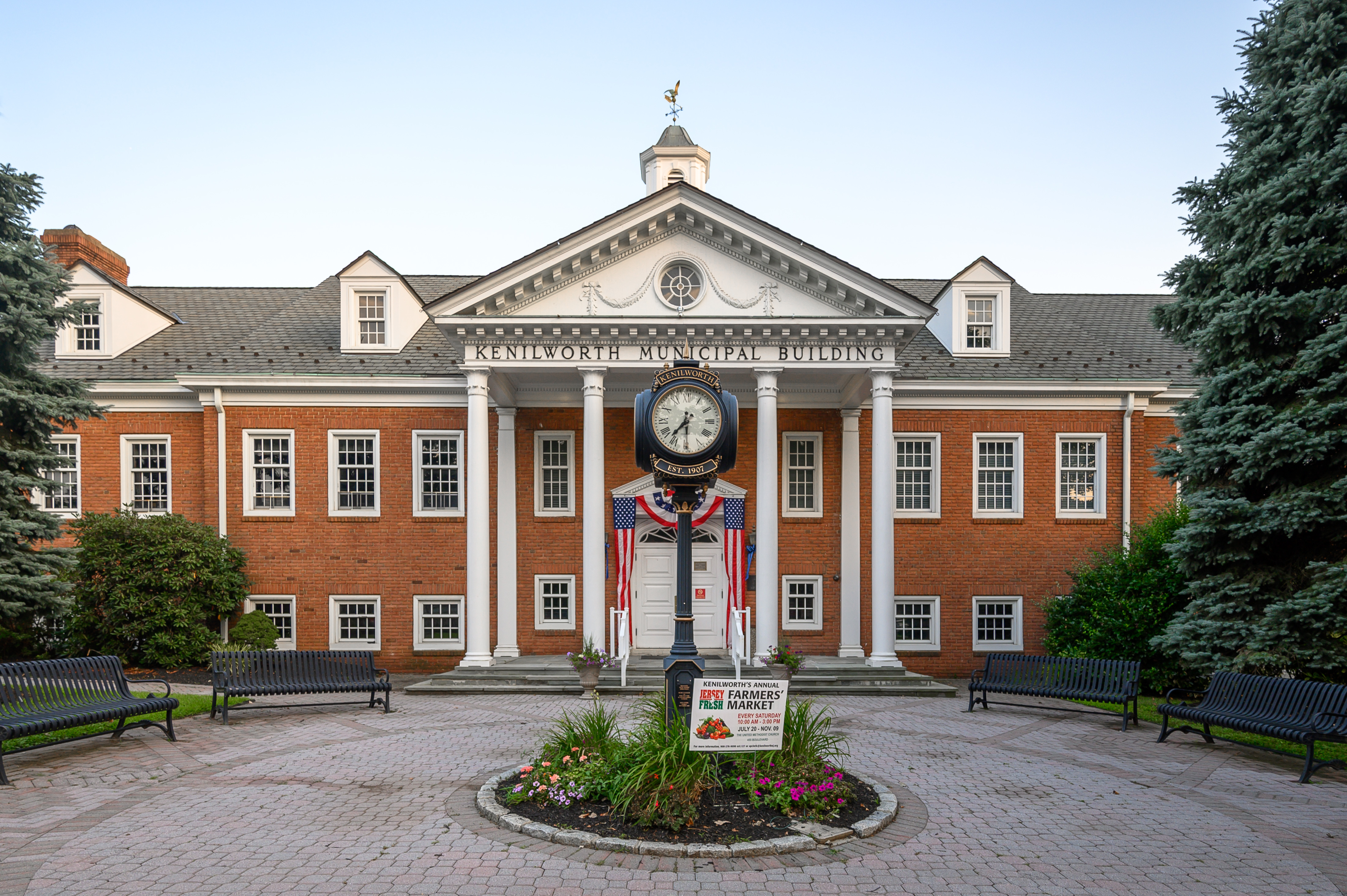
- Kenilworth Municipal Building

- Flag Seal

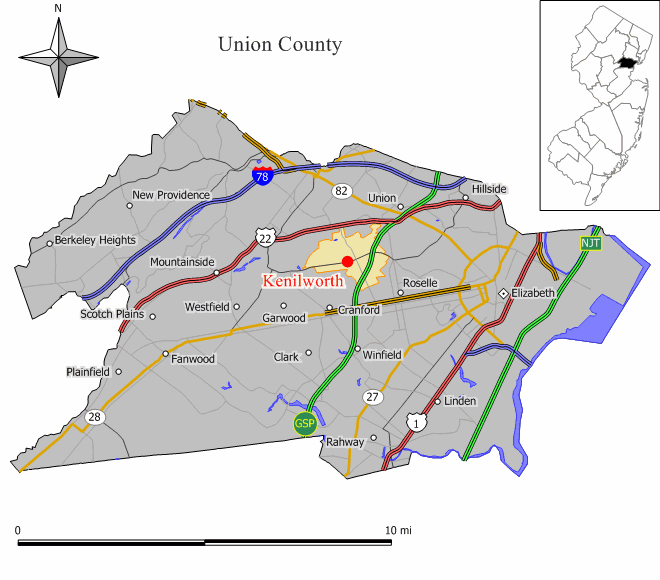
- Map of Kenilworth in Union County. Inset: Location of Union County highlighted in the State of New Jersey.

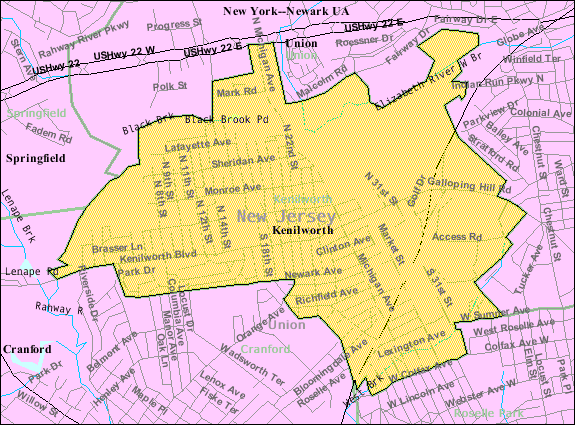
- Census Bureau map of Kenilworth, New Jersey

- Location in Union County Location in New Jersey Location in the United States
- Coordinates: 40.678089°N 74.288114°W
- Country: United States
- State: New Jersey
- County: Union
- Incorporated: May 13, 1907
- Named for: Kenilworth Castle

Government
  - Type: Borough
  - Body: Borough Council
  - Mayor: Linda Karlovitch (D, term ends December 31, 2027)
  - Municipal clerk: Laura Reinertsen

Area
  - Total: 2.15 sq mi (5.57 km^{2})
  - Land: 2.15 sq mi (5.56 km^{2})
  - Water: 0.0039 sq mi (0.01 km^{2}) 0.19%
  - Rank: 398th of 565 in state 17th of 21 in county
- Elevation: 115 ft (35 m)

Population (2020)
  - Total: 8,427
  - Estimate (2024): 8,527
  - Rank: 282nd of 565 in state 17th of 21 in county
  - Density: 3,925/sq mi (1,515/km^{2})
  - Rank: 166th of 565 in state 14th of 21 in county
- Time zone: UTC−05:00 (Eastern (EST))
  - Summer (DST): UTC−04:00 (Eastern (EDT))
- ZIP Code: 07033
- Area code: 908
- FIPS code: 3403936690
- GNIS feature ID: 0885267
- Website: www.kenilworthborough.com

Kenilworth is a borough in Union County, in the U.S. state of New Jersey. As of the 2020 United States census, the borough's population was 8,427, an increase of 513 (+6.5%) from the 2010 census count of 7,914, which in turn reflected an increase of 239 (+3.1%) from the 7,675 counted in the 2000 census.

Kenilworth was incorporated as a borough by an act of the New Jersey Legislature on May 13, 1907, from portions of Cranford and Union Township, based on the results of a referendum held on June 18, 1907.

== History ==
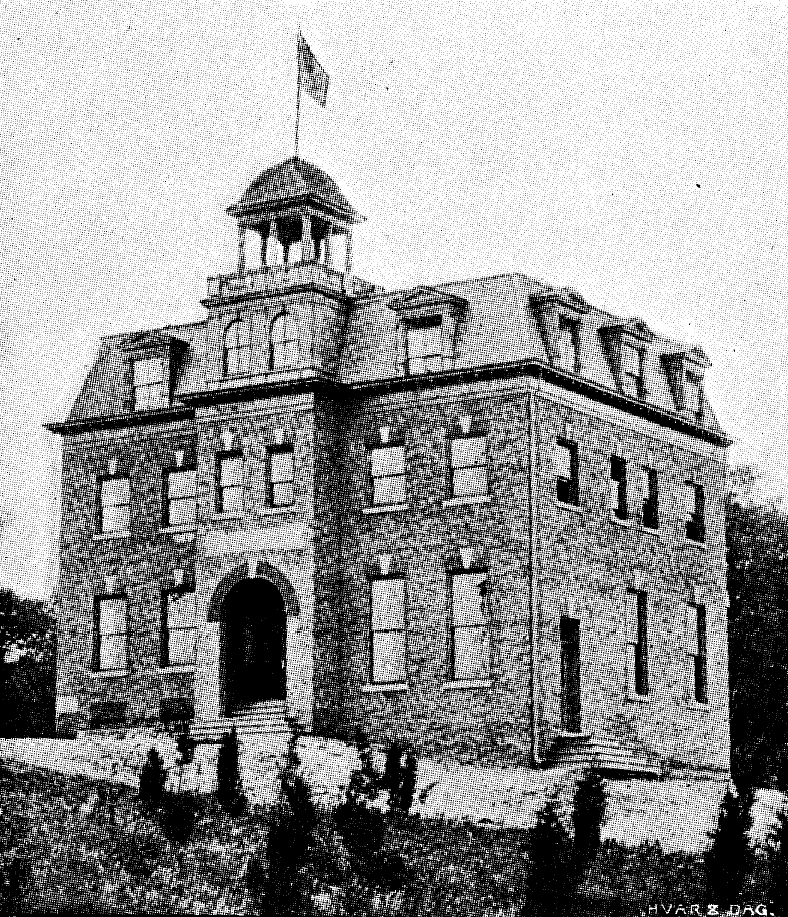
Upsala College

In the late 1890s, the New Orange Industrial Association purchased land in Cranford and Union that was subdivided into building lots. The firm brought in several large industries and lured Upsala College from Brooklyn with an offer of cash and free land for its campus.

Because New Orange was often confused with one of The Oranges in Essex County, the name "Kenilworth" was chosen when the borough was incorporated in 1907. The name Kenilworth came from a literary society (The Kenilworth Club) which the businessmen belonged to. The Kenilworth Club was named in honor of the novel Kenilworth written in 1821 by Sir Walter Scott. The novel refers to England's Kenilworth Castle located in Kenilworth, England.

== Geography ==
According to the United States Census Bureau, the borough has an area of 2.15 square miles (5.57 km^{2}), including 2.15 square miles (5.56 km^{2}) of land and <0.01 square miles (0.01 km^{2}) of water (0.19%).

The upper reaches of Rahway River Parkway along tributaries of the Rahway River run through the borough.

The borough is bordered to the north and east by Union Township, to the southeast by Roselle Park, to the southwest by Cranford, and to the northwest by Springfield Township.

== Parks and recreation ==
Lenape Park is a 450-acre (180 ha) wildlife reserve and park that is part of the Rahway River Parkway in Union County. The park also includes portions of Cranford, Springfield and Westfield. An approximately 4.5-mile off-road paved pedestrian path stretches eastbound from Mountainside Police Headquarters in Mountainside, through Echo Lake Park in Westfield, Lenape Park in Westfield and Cranford, Black Brook Park in Kenilworth, and ending near 505 North Michigan Avenue in Kenilworth.

=== Kenilworth RVRR rail trail ===
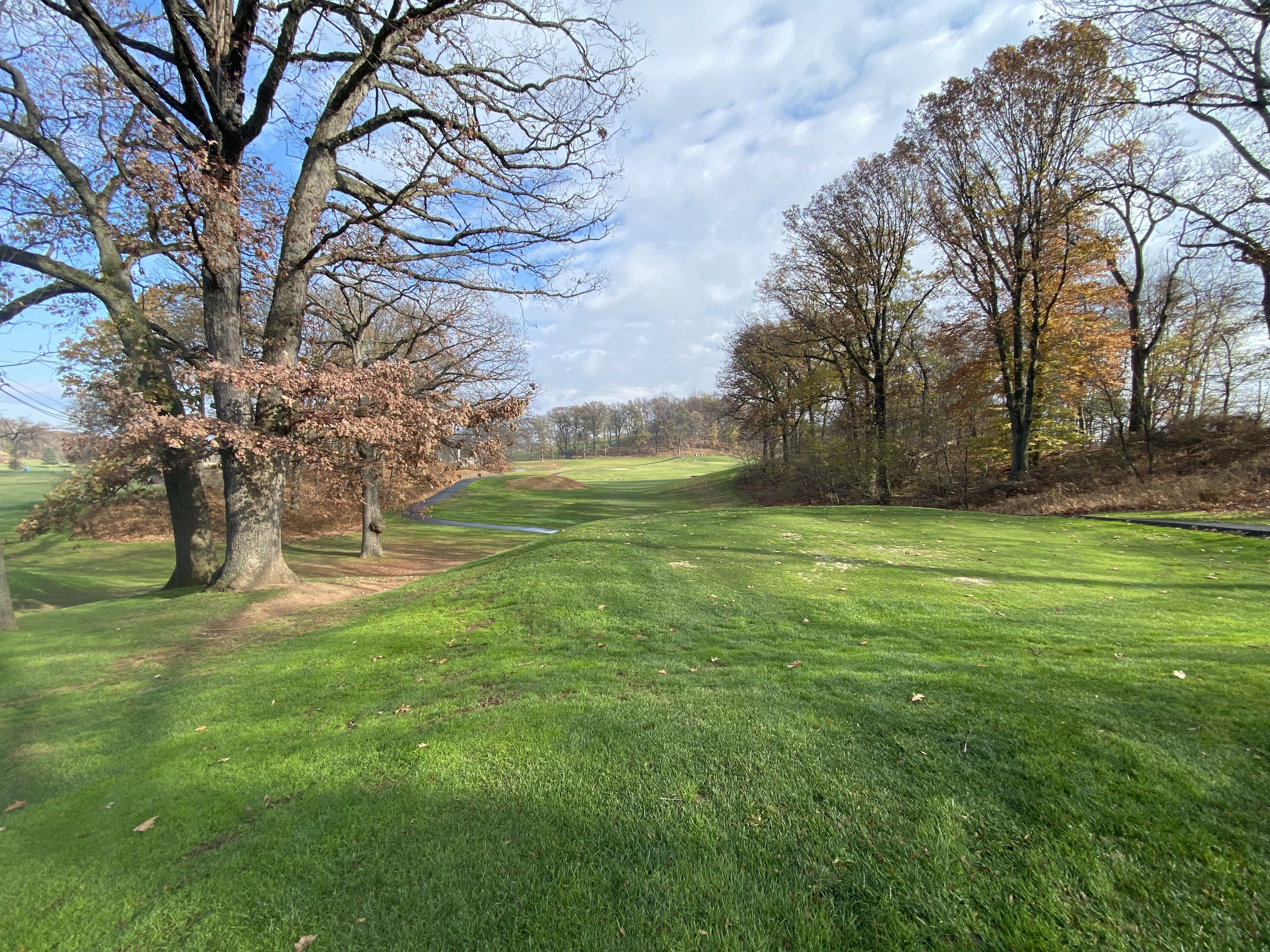
Galloping Hill Golf Course in November 2022

Lines of the abandoned Rahway Valley Railroad

Area residents have proposed a 7.3-mile pedestrian linear park along the "main line" of the abandoned Rahway Valley Railroad that would run through Kenilworth. The rail trail would run eastbound from Overlook Medical Center on the edge of downtown Summit and head south through Springfield, Union, over Route 22 to Kenilworth. In Kenilworth, it would pass between Party City and Burger King on Route 22, run behind Retro Fitness, running south past the Galloping Hill Golf Course, and end at the southwest edge of Roselle Park at the Cranford border.

A northern portion of the rail trail on the RVRR main line is under construction as the Summit Park Line, with a footbridge over Morris Avenue installed in October 2022. In parallel, advocates have been pushing for immediate development of the portion of the RVRR Main Line south of Route 22, running past the Galloping Hill Golf Course through Kenilworth and Roselle Park. The New Jersey Department of Transportation, which owns the railbed, has been working to clear it in anticipation of possible future trail use for pedestrians and cyclists.

== Demographics ==
Historical population
Census	Pop.	Note	%±
1910	779		—
1920	1,312		68.4%
1930	2,243		71.0%
1940	2,451		9.3%
1950	4,922		100.8%
1960	8,379		70.2%
1970	9,165		9.4%
1980	8,221		−10.3%
1990	7,574		−7.9%
2000	7,675		1.3%
2010	7,914		3.1%
2020	8,427		6.5%
2024 (est.)	8,527	▲	1.2%
Population sources: 1910–1920 1910 1910–1930; 1940–2000 2000; 2010 2020

=== Racial and ethnic composition ===
Kenilworth borough, New Jersey – Racial and ethnic composition Note: the US Census treats Hispanic/Latino as an ethnic category. This table excludes Latinos from the racial categories and assigns them to a separate category. Hispanics/Latinos may be of any race.
Race / Ethnicity (NH = Non-Hispanic)	Pop 2000	Pop 2010	Pop 2020	% 2000	% 2010	% 2020
White alone (NH)	6,539	6,047	5,524	85.20%	76.41%	65.55%
Black or African American alone (NH)	183	213	219	2.38%	2.69%	2.60%
Native American or Alaska Native alone (NH)	3	9	8	0.04%	0.11%	0.09%
Asian alone (NH)	220	303	435	2.87%	3.83%	5.16%
Native Hawaiian or Pacific Islander alone (NH)	0	2	2	0.00%	0.03%	0.02%
Other race alone (NH)	3	23	38	0.04%	0.29%	0.45%
Mixed race or Multiracial (NH)	64	89	268	0.83%	1.12%	3.18%
Hispanic or Latino (any race)	663	1,228	1,933	8.64%	15.52%	22.94%
Total	7,675	7,914	8,427	100.00%	100.00%	100.00%

=== 2020 census ===
As of the 2020 census, Kenilworth had a population of 8,427. The median age was 41.4 years. 21.5% of residents were under the age of 18 and 16.0% of residents were 65 years of age or older. For every 100 females there were 95.6 males, and for every 100 females age 18 and over there were 91.5 males age 18 and over.

100.0% of residents lived in urban areas, while 0.0% lived in rural areas.

There were 2,932 households in Kenilworth, of which 36.8% had children under the age of 18 living in them. Of all households, 56.6% were married-couple households, 13.2% were households with a male householder and no spouse or partner present, and 24.6% were households with a female householder and no spouse or partner present. About 19.0% of all households were made up of individuals and 9.2% had someone living alone who was 65 years of age or older.

There were 3,019 housing units, of which 2.9% were vacant. The homeowner vacancy rate was 1.0% and the rental vacancy rate was 3.6%.

=== 2010 census ===
The 2010 United States census counted 7,914 people, 2,841 households, and 2,102 families in the borough. The population density was 3,668.3 per square mile (1,416.3/km^{2}). There were 2,924 housing units at an average density of 1,355.3 per square mile (523.3/km^{2}). The racial makeup was 88.07% (6,970) White, 2.91% (230) Black or African American, 0.14% (11) Native American, 3.84% (304) Asian, 0.03% (2) Pacific Islander, 3.31% (262) from other races, and 1.71% (135) from two or more races. Hispanic or Latino of any race were 15.52% (1,228) of the population.

Of the 2,841 households, 31.6% had children under the age of 18; 55.2% were married couples living together; 13.3% had a female householder with no husband present and 26.0% were non-families. Of all households, 21.2% were made up of individuals and 10.5% had someone living alone who was 65 years of age or older. The average household size was 2.78 and the average family size was 3.26.

21.8% of the population were under the age of 18, 7.8% from 18 to 24, 26.7% from 25 to 44, 28.1% from 45 to 64, and 15.6% who were 65 years of age or older. The median age was 40.9 years. For every 100 females, the population had 93.9 males. For every 100 females ages 18 and older there were 90.0 males.

The Census Bureau's 2006–2010 American Community Survey showed that (in 2010 inflation-adjusted dollars) median household income was $76,500 (with a margin of error of +/− $8,607) and the median family income was $84,097 (+/− $6,220). Males had a median income of $58,327 (+/− $7,147) versus $42,589 (+/− $5,730) for females. The per capita income for the borough was $31,959 (+/− $2,853). About 4.0% of families and 5.7% of the population were below the poverty line, including 11.6% of those under age 18 and 4.5% of those age 65 or over.

=== 2000 census ===
As of the 2000 United States census there were 7,675 people, 2,854 households, and 2,117 families residing in the borough. The population density was 3,584.9 inhabitants per square mile (1,384.1/km^{2}). There were 2,926 housing units at an average density of 1,366.7 per square mile (527.7/km^{2}). The racial makeup of the borough was 92.30% White, 2.30% African American, 0.25% Native American, 2.88% Asian, 1.80% from other races, and 1.38% from two or more races. Hispanic or Latino residents of any race were 8.64% of the population.

There were 2,854 households, out of which 28.6% had children under the age of 18 living with them, 58.4% were married couples living together, 11.9% had a female householder with no husband present, and 25.8% were non-families. 21.4% of all households were made up of individuals, and 11.0% had someone living alone who was 65 years of age or older. The average household size was 2.69 and the average family size was 3.15.

In the borough the population was spread out, with 20.8% under the age of 18, 6.9% from 18 to 24, 30.8% from 25 to 44, 23.3% from 45 to 64, and 18.2% who were 65 years of age or older. The median age was 40 years. For every 100 females, there were 94.2 males. For every 100 females age 18 and over, there were 90.7 males.

The median income for a household in the borough was $59,929, and the median income for a family was $66,500. Males had a median income of $40,808 versus $34,698 for females. The per capita income for the borough was $24,343. About 1.9% of families and 2.0% of the population were below the poverty line, including 2.2% of those under age 18 and 3.2% of those age 65 or over.

== Economy ==
Companies headquartered in Kenilworth include Maingear, a privately held computer manufacturer specializing in custom gaming computers, desktops, custom laptops, media center computers and workstations, all of which are manufactured in the United States.

In 2013, Merck & Co. announced plans to move its global headquarters to Kenilworth from Whitehouse Station in Readington Township, on a site the company had previously used as a manufacturing facility, with the relocation to be completed by 2015. The campus had been used as the global headquarters for Schering-Plough, which Merck acquired in 2009. In 2020, Merck announced that it would move its global headquarters from Kenilworth to Rahway by the end of 2023.

== Arts and culture ==
Since 2004, the Hudson Shakespeare Company has performed its Shakespeare in the Park programs at the Kenilworth Library, a series known as the "Bard on the Boulevard". The Friends of the Kenilworth Library sponsor these events with the assistance of a grant from the Union County Office of Cultural Affairs.

== Government ==
=== Local government ===
Kenilworth is governed under the borough form of New Jersey municipal government, which is used in 218 municipalities (of the 564) statewide, making it New Jersey's most common form of government. The governing body comprises the mayor and the borough council, with all positions elected at-large on a partisan basis in the November general election. The mayor is elected directly by the voters to a four-year term of office. The borough council includes six members elected to serve three-year terms on a staggered basis, with two seats up for election each year in a three-year cycle. Kenilworth has a "weak mayor / strong council" government, in which council members act as the legislative body, with the mayor presiding at meetings and voting only in the event of a tie. The mayor can veto ordinances subject to an override by a two-thirds majority vote of the council. The mayor makes committee and liaison assignments for council members, and makes most appointments with the council's advice and consent.

As of 2026, the mayor of Kenilworth is Democrat Linda Karlovitch. Her term in office ends on December 31, 2027. Members of the Kenilworth Borough Council are Council President William Mauro (R, 2028), Patrick Boyle (D, 2026), Joseph Finistrella (R, 2027), Toni Giordano Picerno (D, 2026), Douglas Piper (R, 2027), and Savino Scorese (R, 2028).

==== Mayors of Kenilworth ====
#	Mayor	Years in Office	Notes
1	Charles C. Boyd (D)	1907–1909	First mayor
2	William J. Hoiles (R)	1910–1913	
3	John Hiller (R)	1914–1915	
4	Charles C. Boyd (D)	1916–1919	
5	Oswald Nitschke (D)	1919–1922	
6	William J. Hoiles (R)	1922–1923	
7	Charles A. Kosmutza (R)	1924–1925	
8	August J. Stahl (R)	1926–1927	
9	Oswald Nitschke (D)	1928–1929	
10	August J. Stahl (R)	1930–1931	
11	Oswald Nitschke (D)	1932–1933	
12	Charles A. Kosmutza (R)	1934–1935	
13	Anthony Grippo (R)	1936–1939	
14	Max J. Berzin (R)	1940–1947	
15	Fred V. Pitten (R)	1948–1951	
16	William Lister (R)	1952–1953	
17	Robert Krueger (R)	1954–1955	
18	Walter E. Boright (D)	1956–1961	
19	William J. Ahern, Jr. (D)	1962–1969	
20	William E. Conrad, Jr. (R)	1970–1975	
21	Livio Mancino (D, I)	1976–1987	
22	Joseph A. Benintente (R)	1988–1990	Ill during term due to a gastrointestinal perforation and related infections in October 1989; Dennis Schultz served as acting mayor for most of 1989; resigned on February 1, 1990 after discovering the need for more surgeries.
23	Eugene Pepe (D)	1990	Acting mayor until 1990 election after Benintente's resignation
24	Joseph J. Rego (R)	1990–1995	
25	Michael A. Tripodi (R)	1996–2003	
26	Gregg F. David (D)	2004–2007	
27	Kathi Fiamingo (R)	2008–2014	First female mayor; resigned after becoming a tax judge
28	Scott Klinder (R)	2014	Acting mayor until 2014 election
29	Fred Pugliese (R)	2014–2015	
30	Anthony DeLuca (D)	2016–2019	
31	Linda Karlovitch (D)	2020–	

=== Federal, state, and county representation ===
Kenilworth is in New Jersey's 10th congressional district and New Jersey's 20th state legislative district.

For the 119th United States Congress, New Jersey's 10th congressional district is represented by LaMonica McIver (D, Newark). New Jersey is represented in the United States Senate by Democrats Cory Booker (Newark, term ends 2027) and Andy Kim (Moorestown, term ends 2031).

For the 2026–2027 session, the 20th legislative district of the New Jersey Legislature is represented in the State Senate by Joseph Cryan (D, Union Township) and in the General Assembly by Annette Quijano (D, Elizabeth) and Ed Rodriguez (D, Elizabeth).

Union County is governed by a Board of County Commissioners, whose nine members are elected at-large to three-year terms of office on a staggered basis with three seats coming up for election each year, with an appointed County Manager overseeing the day-to-day operations of the county. At an annual reorganization meeting held in the beginning of January, the board selects a Chair and Vice Chair from among its members. As of 2026, Union County's County Commissioners are:

Vice Chair Rebecca Williams (D, Plainfield, 2028), Chairman Joesph Bodek (D, Linden, 2026), James E. Baker Jr. (D, Rahway, 2027), Michele Delisfort (D, Union Township, 2026), Lourdes M. Leon (D, Elizabeth, 2026), Alexander Mirabella (D, Fanwood, 2027) Kimberly Palmieri-Mouded (D, Westfield, 2027). Stanley J. Neron (D, Elizabeth, 2028), Joseph Signorello III (D, Roselle Park, 2028)

Constitutional officers elected on a countywide basis are: Clerk Vacant - Incumbent Clerk Joanne Rajoppi (D, Union Township) died on July 16, 2026. Her death triggered a special election for a full five-year term to be held concurrently with the November 2026 general election. Deputy Clerk Clara Fernández assumes the powers of the office until the vacancy is filled. Sheriff Peter Corvelli (D, Kenilworth, 2026) and Surrogate Christopher E. Hudak (D, Clark, 2027).

=== Politics ===
As of March 2011, Kenilworth had 4,891 registered voters, of whom 1,496 (30.6% vs. 41.8% countywide) were registered as Democrats, 1,076 (22.0% vs. 15.3%) as Republicans, and 2,317 (47.4% vs. 42.9%) as Unaffiliated. Two were registered as either Libertarians or Greens. Among the borough's 2010 census population, 61.8% (vs. 53.3% in Union County) were registered to vote, including 79.1% of those over 17 (vs. 70.6% countywide).

Gubernatorial election results for Kenilworth
Year	Republican		Democratic		Third party(ies)	
Year	No.	%	No.	%	No.	%
2025	1,798	55.43%	1,434	44.20%	12	0.37%
2021	1,692	63.30%	963	36.03%	18	0.67%
2017	1,067	52.64%	912	44.99%	48	2.37%
2013	1,357	66.23%	657	32.06%	35	1.71%
2009	1,442	60.74%	759	31.97%	173	7.29%
2005	1,200	51.17%	1,078	45.97%	67	2.86%

In the 2012 presidential election, Republican Mitt Romney received 1,775 votes (52.6% vs. 32.3% countywide), ahead of Democrat Barack Obama's 1,535 (45.5% vs. 66.0%) and other candidates' 39 (1.2% vs. 0.8%), among the 3,376 ballots cast by the borough's 5,167 registered voters, for a turnout of 65.3% (vs. 68.8% in Union County). In the 2008 presidential election, Republican John McCain received 2,064 votes (55.5% vs. 35.2% countywide), ahead of Obama's 1,564 (42.0% vs. 63.1%) and other candidates with 54 votes (1.5% vs. 0.9%), among the 3,721 ballots cast by the borough's 5,039 registered voters, for a turnout of 73.8% (vs. 74.7% in Union County). In the 2004 presidential election, Republican George W. Bush received 1,949 votes (54.0% vs. 40.3% countywide), ahead of Democrat John Kerry's 1,589 (44.0% vs. 58.3%) and other candidates with 32 (0.9% vs. 0.7%), among the 3,608 ballots cast by the borough's 4,927 registered voters, for a turnout of 73.2% (vs. 72.3% in the whole county).

United States presidential election results for Kenilworth
Year	Republican		Democratic		Third party(ies)	
Year	No.	%	No.	%	No.	%
2024	2,629	61.73%	1,566	36.77%	64	1.50%
2020	2,498	56.89%	1,835	41.79%	58	1.32%
2016	2,146	57.21%	1,491	39.75%	114	3.04%
2012	1,775	53.00%	1,535	45.83%	39	1.16%
2008	2,064	56.06%	1,564	42.48%	54	1.47%
2004	1,949	54.59%	1,589	44.51%	32	0.90%

In the 2017 gubernatorial election, Republican Kim Guadagno received 1,065 votes (52.6% vs. 32.6% countywide), ahead of Democrat Phil Murphy's 912 (45.0% vs. 65.2%), and other candidates with 48 (2.4% vs. 2.1%), among the 2,099 ballots cast by the borough's 5,365 registered voters, for a turnout of 39.1%. In the 2013 gubernatorial election, Republican Chris Christie received 66.2% of the vote (1,357 cast), ahead of Democrat Barbara Buono with 32.1% (657 votes), and other candidates with 1.7% (35 votes), among the 2,099 ballots cast by the borough's 5,073 registered voters (50 ballots were spoiled), for a turnout of 41.4%. In the 2009 gubernatorial election, Christie received 1,442 votes (59.9% vs. 41.7% countywide), ahead of Democrat Jon Corzine's 759 (31.5% vs. 50.6%), Independent Chris Daggett's 148 (6.1% vs. 5.9%), and other candidates' 25 (1.0% vs. 0.8%), among the 2,408 ballots cast by the borough's 4,996 registered voters, yielding a 48.2% turnout (vs. 46.5% in the county).

United States Senate election results for Kenilworth1
Year	Republican		Democratic		Third party(ies)	
Year	No.	%	No.	%	No.	%
2024	2,305	58.86%	1,526	38.97%	85	2.17%
2018	1,432	54.74%	1,025	39.18%	159	6.08%
2012	1,441	49.57%	1,407	48.40%	59	2.03%
2006	1,381	55.75%	1,039	41.95%	57	2.30%

United States Senate election results for Kenilworth2
Year	Republican		Democratic		Third party(ies)	
Year	No.	%	No.	%	No.	%
2020	2,324	54.71%	1,839	43.29%	85	2.00%
2014	982	53.02%	835	45.09%	35	1.89%
2013	743	62.59%	428	36.06%	16	1.35%
2008	1,656	52.69%	1,432	45.56%	55	1.75%

== Education ==
The Kenilworth Public Schools serves students in pre-kindergarten through twelfth grade. As of the 2024–25 school year, the district, comprised of two schools, had an enrollment of 1,451 students and 133.3 classroom teachers (on an FTE basis), for a student–teacher ratio of 10.9:1. Schools in the district (with 2024–25 enrollment data from the National Center for Education Statistics) are Warren G. Harding Elementary School with 659 students in grades PreK–5, David Brearley Middle School for grades 6–8 and David Brearley High School for grades 9–12, with a combined enrollment of 774 students in the middle school and high school.

Students from Winfield Township attend David Brearley High School as part of a sending/receiving relationship with the Winfield Township School District.

Kenilworth is home to St. Theresa School, a Roman Catholic school operating under the Archdiocese of Newark founded in 1955 that serves students in pre-school through eighth grade through the Salesians of Don Bosco.

== Churches ==
There are six churches that are located in Kenilworth. The six churches are the Ignite United Methodist church, the First Baptist church, the Union Baptist church, the non-denominational Kenilworth Gospel Chapel, the Saint Paul African Methodist Episcopal church, and the Saint Theresa Roman Catholic church.

== Transportation ==
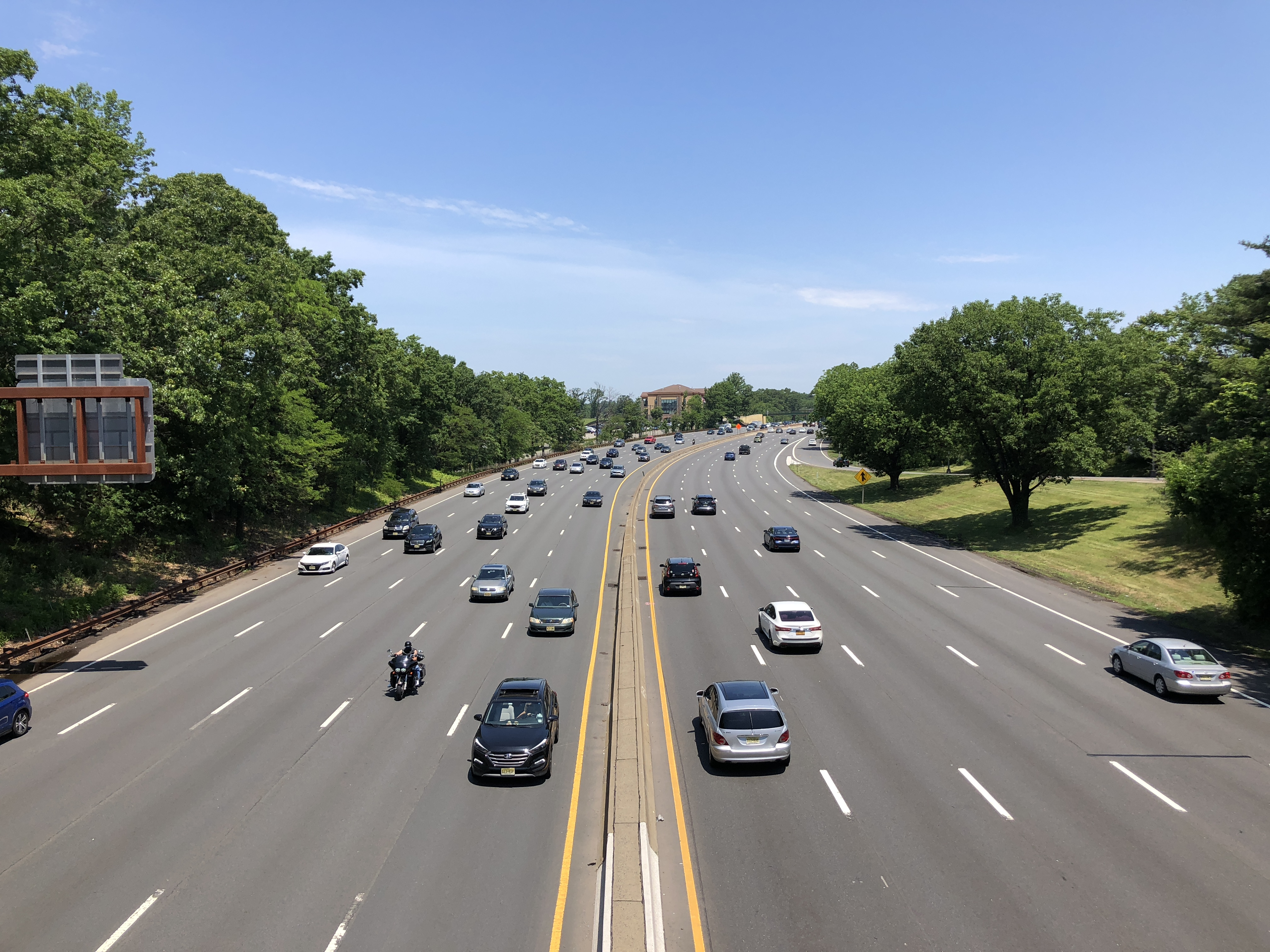
View north along the Garden State Parkway in Kenilworth

=== Roads and highways ===
As of May 2010, the borough had a total of 29.62 miles (47.67 km) of roadways, of which 24.22 miles (38.98 km) were maintained by the municipality, 4.00 miles (6.44 km) by Union County and 0.04 miles (0.064 km) by the New Jersey Department of Transportation.

Kenilworth is served by two county routes, County Route 509 and County Route 617. CR 509 (Boulevard) runs west–east through the borough, connecting it to Cranford, Springfield and Westfield in one direction and Union and Roselle Park in the other. CR 617 (Michigan Avenue) runs north–south, connecting Union and U.S. Route 22 at its north end to Roselle Park and Route 28 at its south end. The Garden State Parkway cuts northeast–southwest through the town, with Interchange 138 at CR 509 serving much of the town's long-distance travelers.

=== Public transportation ===
NJ Transit provides bus service between Kenilworth and the Port Authority Bus Terminal in Midtown Manhattan in New York City and to New Jersey points, including the city of Elizabeth and nearby Union County College in Cranford. Local service is available on the 58 route, which is a direct descendant of Kenilworth's trolley route in the early 20th century.

The closest NJ Transit rail station is Roselle Park, less than a mile from the Kenilworth border and offering direct service into New York Penn Station on the Raritan Valley Line.

The Rahway Valley Railroad passed through the community but is currently out of service, the final train on the line having left the borough in April 1992. Originally established as the New York and New Orange Railroad, the line stretched 11.8 miles (19.0 km) from Aldene (now known as Roselle Park) to Summit. The headquarters of the railroad were located in Kenilworth, originally in Kenilworth's Victorian-style station house until that was severely damaged in a 1974 fire, after which railroad offices were moved into a trailer and then an unused railroad club car.

Newark Liberty International Airport is approximately 9 miles (14 km) from Kenilworth.

== Notable people ==
People who were born in, residents of, or otherwise closely associated with Kenilworth include:

- Tashawn Bower (born 1995), defensive end who played in the NFL for the Las Vegas Raiders
- Mike Chalenski (born 1970), former professional American football defensive lineman who played for six seasons in the National Football League
- Sam DeCavalcante (1912–1997), boss of the DeCavalcante crime family known as "Sam the Plumber", who used a Kenilworth plumbing supply business as his front operation
- John P. Gallagher (1932–2011), politician who served in the New Jersey Senate from the 13th Legislative District from 1982 to 1984
- Bill Henry (1942–2022), Major League Baseball pitcher who played for the New York Yankees
- Sheldon Karlin (1950–2000), distance runner who won the New York City Marathon in 1972
- Tony Siragusa (1967–2022), Indianapolis Colts and Baltimore Ravens defensive tackle, was born and raised in Kenilworth, and starred in football and wrestling for David Brearley High School
