= Roselle Park School District =

School district in Union County, New Jersey, US

Address
- 510 Chestnut Street Roselle Park, Union County, New Jersey, 07204; United States
- Coordinates: 40.666832°N 74.265348°W

District information
- Grades: K to 12
- Superintendent: Patricia Gois
- Business administrator: Patricia Mawer
- Schools: 5

Students and staff
- Enrollment: 2,033 (as of 2023–24)
- Faculty: 170.6 FTEs
- Student–teacher ratio: 11.9:1

Other information
- District Factor Group: DE
- Website: www.rpsd.org
Ind.	Per pupil	District spending	Rank (*)	K-12 average	%± vs. average
1A	Total Spending	$18,443	42	$18,891	−2.4%
1	Budgetary Cost	14,386	44	14,783	−2.7%
2	Classroom Instruction	8,512	44	8,763	−2.9%
6	Support Services	2,342	48	2,392	−2.1%
8	Administrative Cost	1,582	44	1,485	6.5%
10	Operations & Maintenance	1,523	28	1,783	−14.6%
13	Extracurricular Activities	321	14	268	19.8%
16	Median Teacher Salary	64,810	42	64,043
Data from NJDoE 2014 Taxpayers' Guide to Education Spending. *Of K-12 districts with 1,800-3,500 students. Lowest spending=1; Highest=68

The Roselle Park School District is a comprehensive community public school district that serves students in kindergarten through twelfth grade from Roselle Park, in Union County, in the U.S. state of New Jersey.

As of the 2023–24 school year, the district, comprised of five schools, had an enrollment of 2,033 students and 170.6 classroom teachers (on an FTE basis), for a student–teacher ratio of 11.9:1.

The district had been classified by the New Jersey Department of Education as being in District Factor Group "DE", the fifth-highest of eight groupings. District Factor Groups organize districts statewide to allow comparison by common socioeconomic characteristics of the local districts. From lowest socioeconomic status to highest, the categories are A, B, CD, DE, FG, GH, I and J.

== Schools ==
Schools in the district (with 2023–24 enrollment data from the National Center for Education Statistics) are:

Elementary schools

- Ernest J. Finizio Aldene Elementary School with 263 students in grades PreK–5
  - Lou Riggi, principal
- Robert Gordon Elementary School with 311 students in grades PreK–5
  - Christine Dougherty, principal
- Sherman Elementary School with 357 students in grades K–5
  - John Flecca, principal

Middle school

- Roselle Park Middle School with 443 students in grades 6–8
  - Michelle Queiruga, principal

High school

- Roselle Park High School with 641 students in grades 9–12
  - Sarah Costa, principal

== Administration ==
Core members of the district's administration are:

- Patricia Gois, superintendent
- Patricia Mawer, business administrator and board secretary

== Board of education ==
The district's board of education, comprised of nine members, sets policy and oversees the fiscal and educational operation of the district through its administration. As a Type II school district, the board's trustees are elected directly by voters to serve three-year terms of office on a staggered basis, with three seats up for election each year held (since 2012) as part of the November general election. The board appoints a superintendent to oversee the district's day-to-day operations and a business administrator to supervise the business functions of the district.
