= Summit, New Jersey =

City in Union County, New Jersey, US

- City
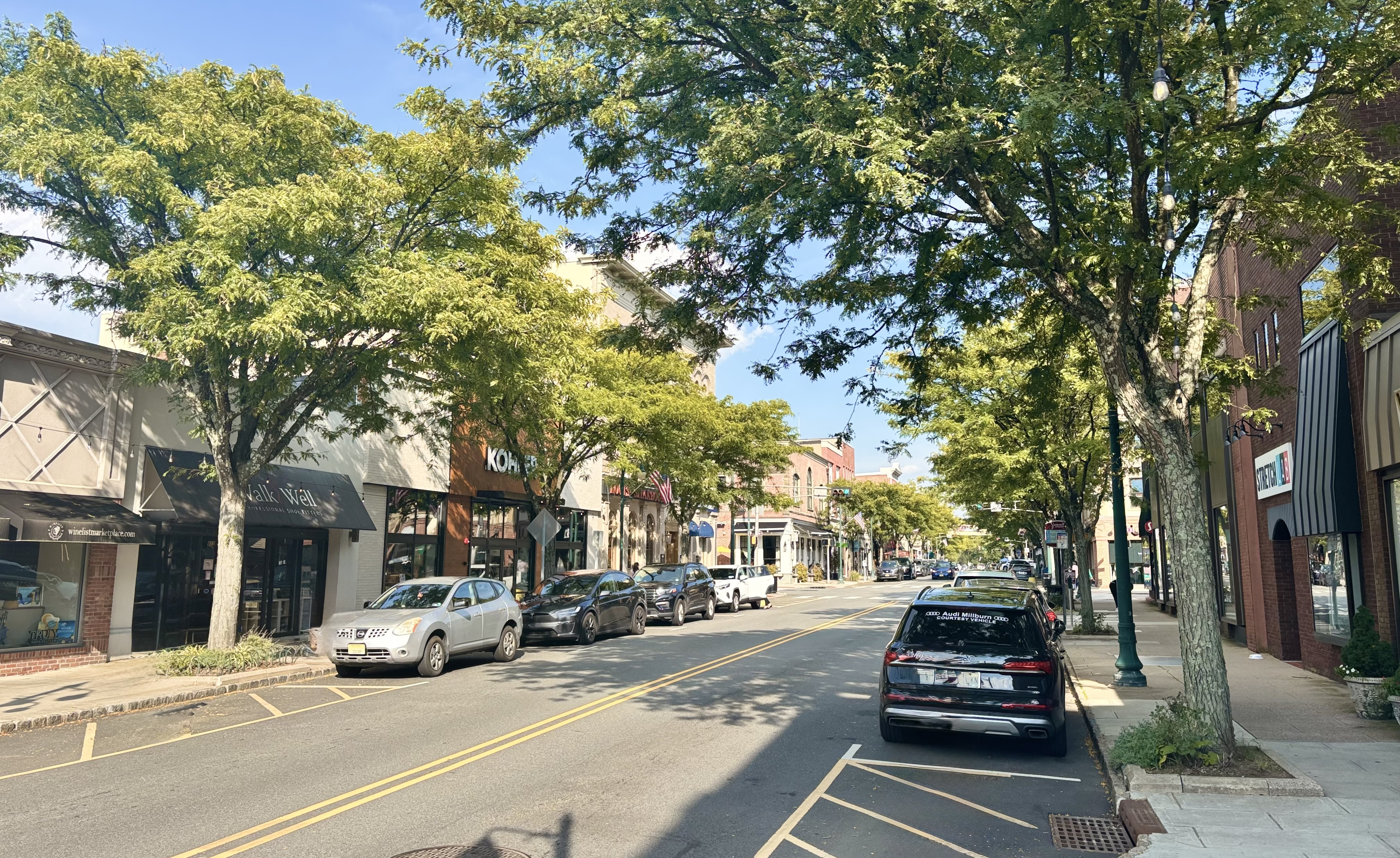
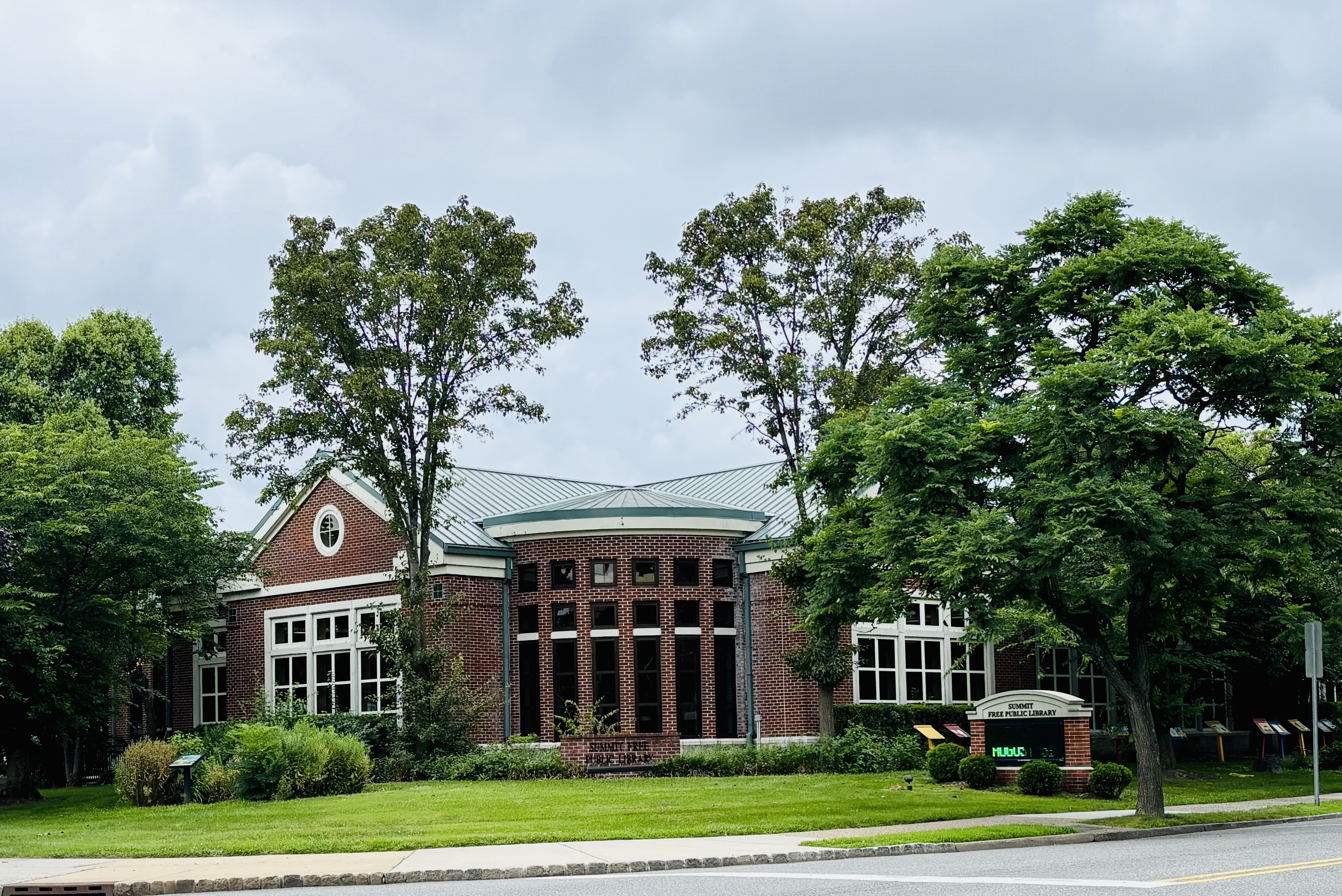
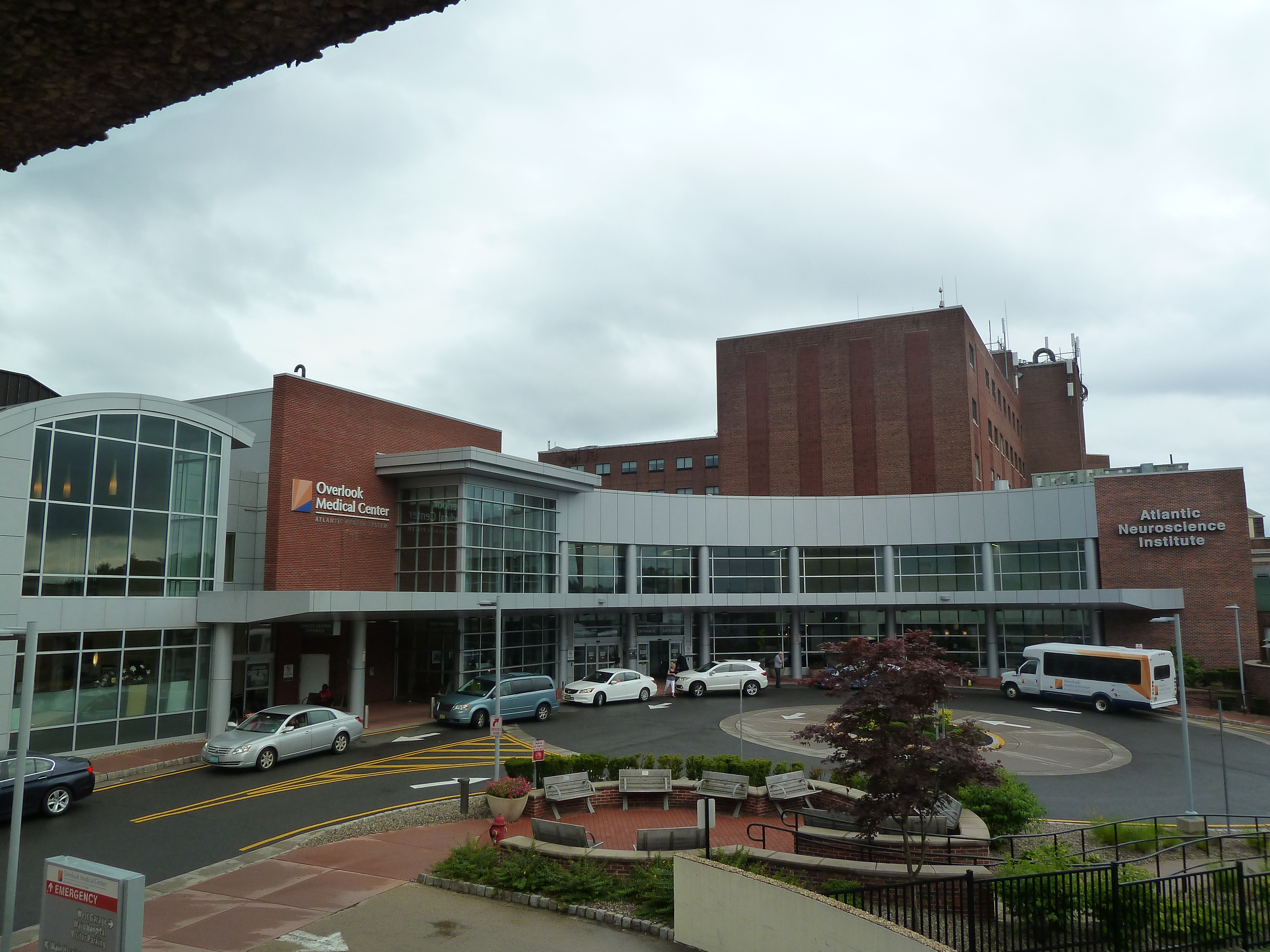
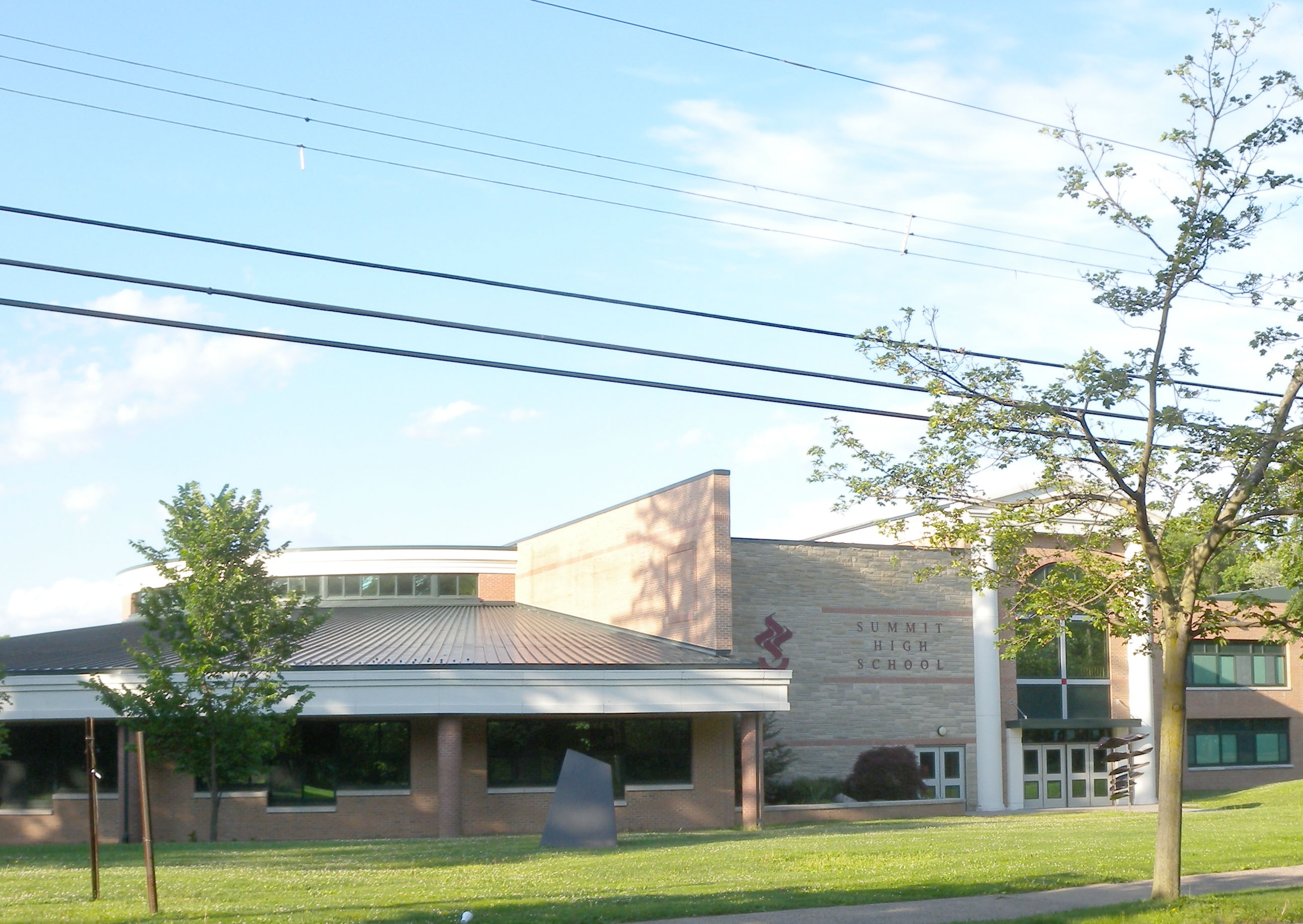
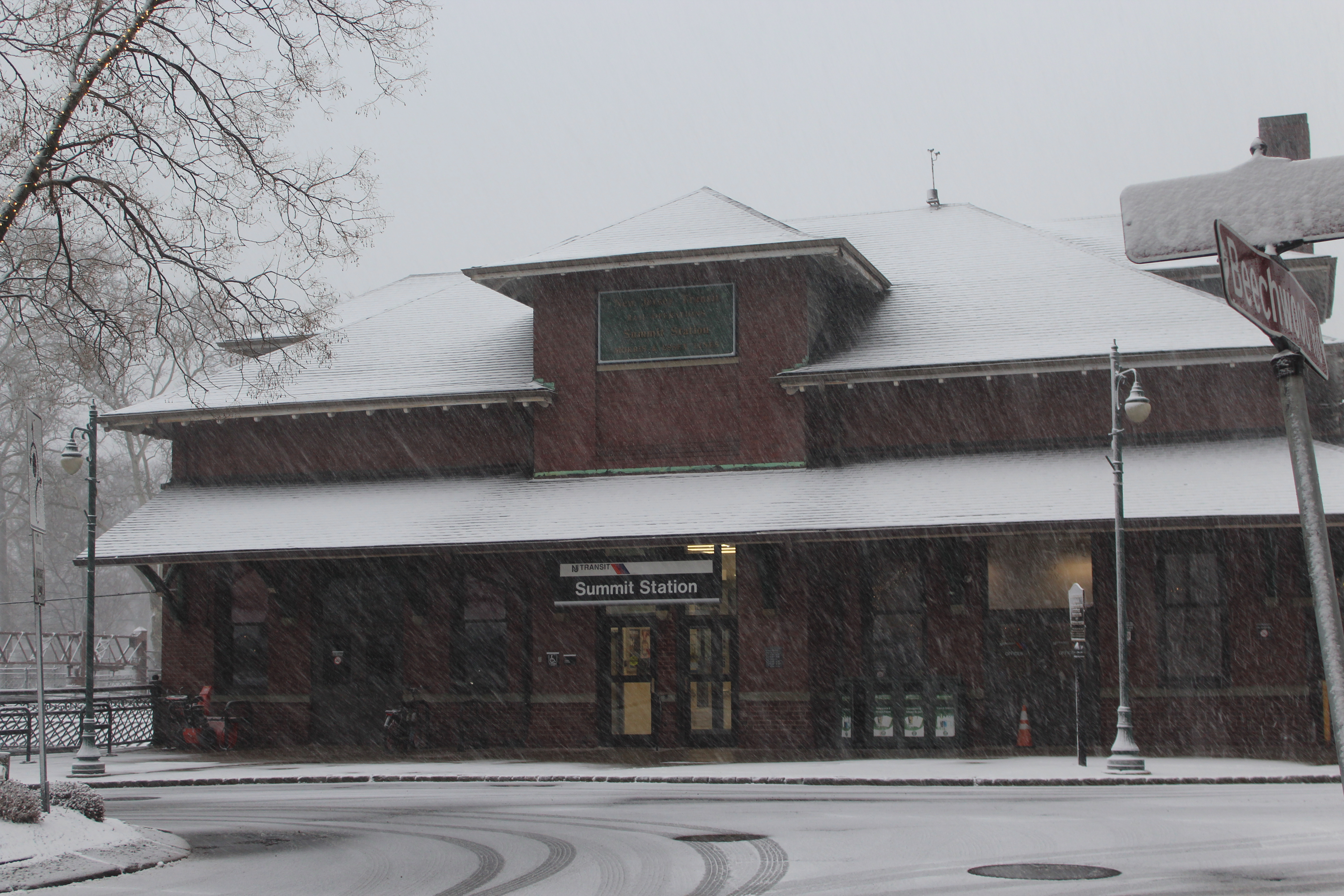
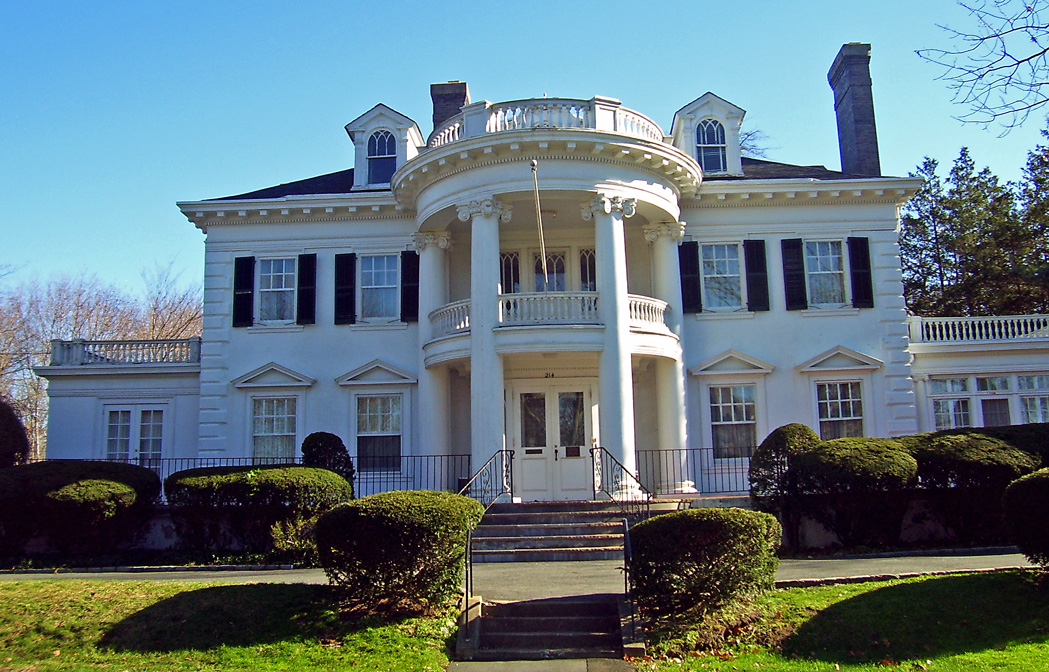
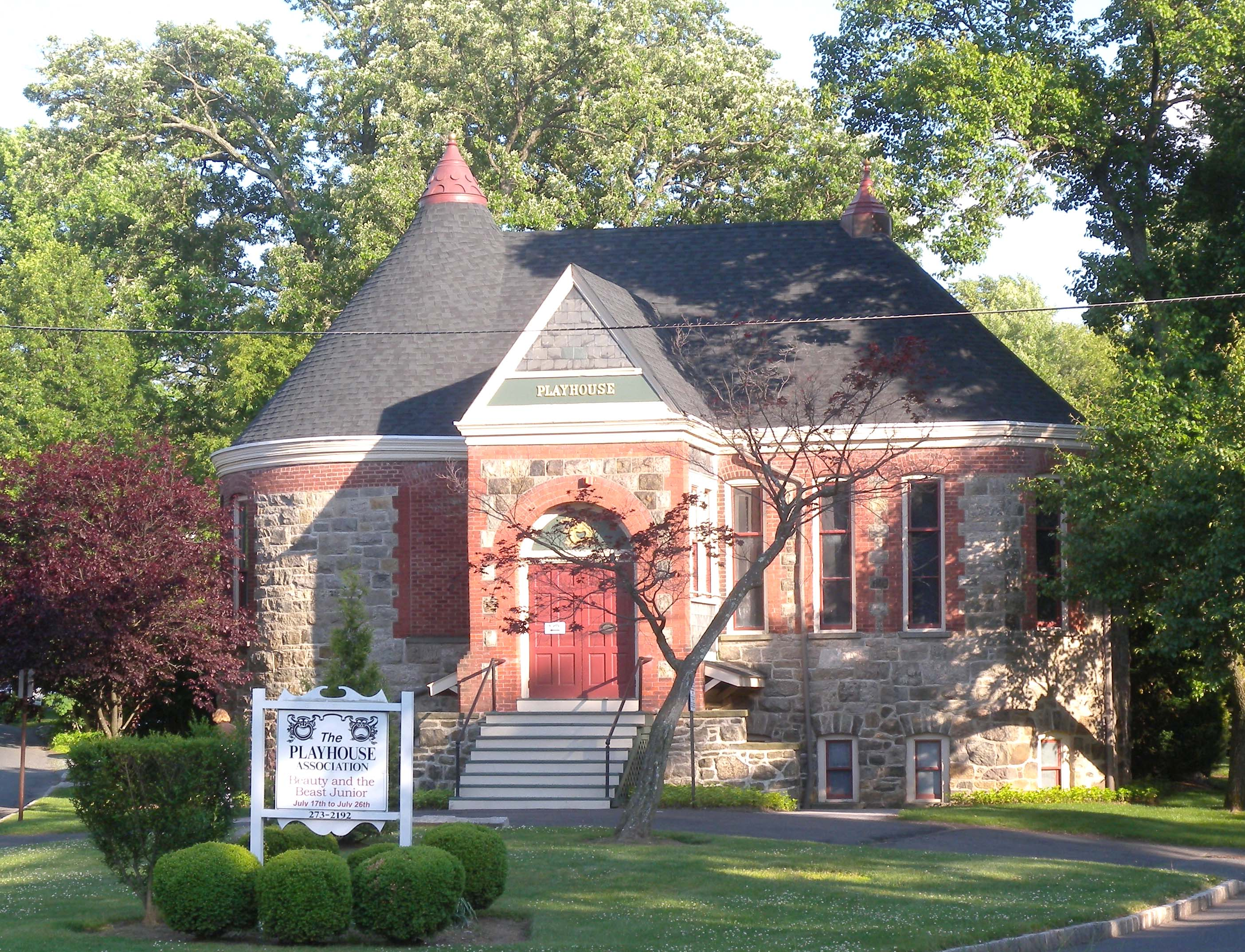
- Springfield Avenue, Downtown Summit Summit Free Public Library Overlook Medical Center Summit High School Summit station Twin Maples Summit Playhouse

- Flag Seal
- Nickname: Hill City
- Motto: Where Community Thrives
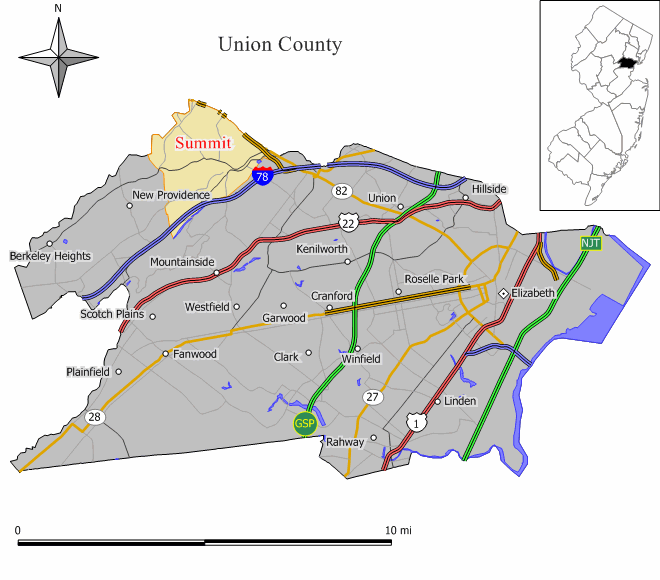
- Location of Summit in Union County highlighted in yellow (left). Inset map: Location of Union County in New Jersey highlighted in black (right).

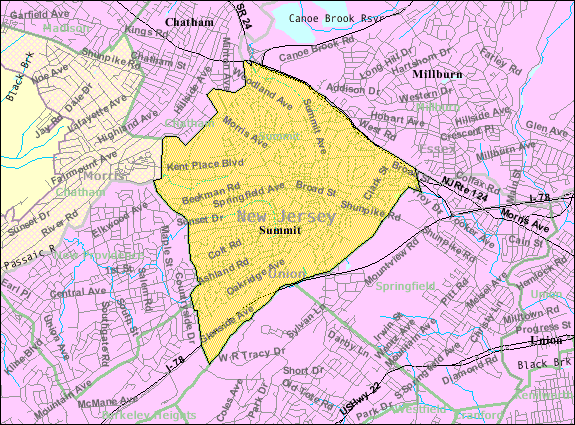
- Census Bureau map of Summit, New Jersey

- Location in Union County Location in New Jersey Location in the United States
- Coordinates: 40.715622°N 74.364684°W
- Country: United States
- State: New Jersey
- County: Union
- Settled: 1710
- Incorporation: March 23, 1869 as Township
- Incorporation: March 8, 1899 as City
- Named for: Summit Lodge or "summit of the Short Hills"

Government
  - Type: City
  - Body: Common Council
  - Mayor: Elizabeth Fagan (R, term ends December 31, 2027)
  - Administrator: Tammie Baldwin
  - Municipal clerk: Rosemary Licatese

Area
  - Total: 6.05 sq mi (15.66 km^{2})
  - Land: 5.99 sq mi (15.52 km^{2})
  - Water: 0.050 sq mi (0.13 km^{2}) 0.84%
  - Rank: 255th of 565 in state 7th of 21 in county
- Elevation: 374 ft (114 m)

Population (2020)
  - Total: 22,719
  - Estimate (2023): 22,344
  - Rank: 119th of 565 in state 9th of 21 in county
  - Density: 3,790.3/sq mi (1,463.4/km^{2})
  - Rank: 172nd of 565 in state 15th of 21 in county
- Time zone: UTC−05:00 (Eastern (EST))
  - Summer (DST): UTC−04:00 (Eastern (EDT))
- ZIP Codes: 07901, 07902
- Area code: 908
- FIPS code: 3403971430
- GNIS feature ID: 085412
- Website: www.cityofsummit.org

Summit is the northernmost city of Union County, in the U.S. state of New Jersey, located within the New York metropolitan area. Situated on a ridge in northern–central New Jersey, the city is located within the Raritan Valley and Rahway Valley regions, and also borders both Essex and Morris counties in the Passaic Valley region. Summit is a commercial hub and commuter town for New York City. As of the 2020 United States census, the city's population was 22,719, an increase of 1,262 (+5.9%) from the 2010 census count of 21,457, which in turn reflected an increase of 326 (+1.5%) from the 21,131 counted in the 2000 census.

Originally incorporated as Summit Township by an act of the New Jersey Legislature on March 23, 1869, from portions of New Providence Township (now Berkeley Heights) and Springfield Township, Summit was reincorporated as a city on March 8, 1899.

Possible derivations of Summit's name include its location atop the Second Watchung Mountain; the Summit Lodge, the house to which jurist James Kent moved in 1837 and which stands today at 50 Kent Place Boulevard; and to a local sawmill owner who granted passage to the Morris and Essex Railroad for a route to "the summit of the Short Hills".

== History ==
=== 18th century ===
Prior to European contact the area that would become Summit was home to the Lenape Indians mainly along the Passaic River and along the shores of Surprise Lake with New Jersey Route 24 forming part of the "Great Minisink Trail." The region in which Summit is located was purchased from Native Americans on October 28, 1664. Summit's earliest European settlers came to the area around the year 1710. The original name of Summit was "Turkey Hill" to distinguish it from the area then known as "Turkey" (New Providence's original name until 1759). During the American Revolutionary War, Summit was known as "Beacon Hill", because "Beacon #10" was lit on an eastern ridge in Summit as part of a network to warn the New Jersey militiamen of approaching British troops.

Summit was called the "Heights over Springfield" during the late 18th century and most of the 19th century, and was considered a part of New Providence. During this period, Summit was part of Springfield Township, which eventually broke up into separate municipalities. Eventually, only Summit and New Providence remained joined.

=== 19th century ===
Lord Chancellor James Kent, a Chancellor of New York State and author of Commentaries on American Law, retired to this area in 1837 in a house he called Summit Lodge (perhaps a namesake of the town) on what is now called Kent Place Boulevard. He lived there until 1847. Today, the lodge is part of a large mansion, at 50 Kent Place Boulevard, opposite Kent Place School.

In 1837 Jonathan Crane Bonnell, a local saw-mill owner, donated some of his land for free to the Morris and Essex Railroad, which became the Delaware Lackawanna and Western Railroad and is now NJ Transit's Morris and Essex Lines, was built over what was then called "The Summit" hill, a name later shortened to Summit. For this Bonnell is remembered as "the father of Summit" as the new railroad spurred growth. Namely, the railroad allowed Summit to outgrow neighboring New Providence, which didn't have a train station. In 1868, a hotel named "The Summit House" burned beside the railroad. In 1869, Summit and New Providence separated and the Summit area was incorporated as the "Township of Summit". In the late 19th century, the area began shifting from farmland to wealthy estates; in 1892, renowned architect C. Abbott French cleared away a crest of a "summit ridge", removing "an impenetrable tangle of wild vines ... and myriads of rattlesnakes", to build a house with a view of New York City, The Times Building, and the Brooklyn Bridge. The present-day incarnation of Summit, known formally as the City of Summit, was incorporated on April 11, 1899.

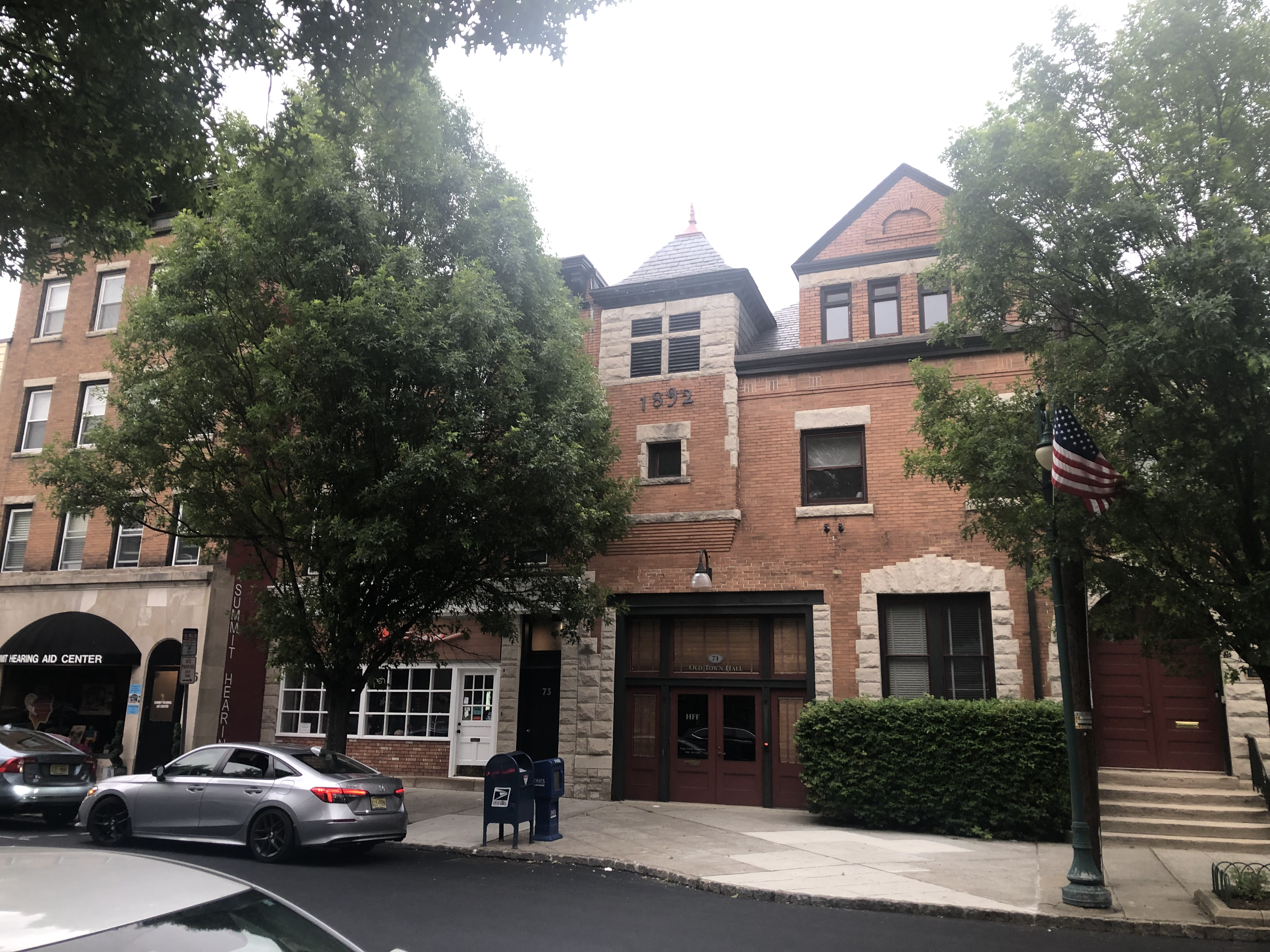
Summit's original town hall constructed in 1892

During this time, Summit was the home of America's "antivice crusader", Anthony Comstock, who moved there about 1880 and built a house in 1892 at 35 Beekman Road, where he died in 1915.

In 1889 the Wisner family built a house at 165 Hobart Avenue which later became the Reeves-Reed Arboretum. In 1891 the first library was built although it was eventually outgrown. Today it is the Summit Playhouse operated by the Paper Mill Playhouse. A post office was also built in 1893 but that too was outgrown and is today the Roots Steakhouse while a Police headquarters was built in 1896.

In the 19th century, Summit served as a nearby getaway spot for wealthy residents of New York City in search of fresh air. Weekenders or summer vacationers would reach Summit by train and relax at large hotels and smaller inns and guest houses. Calvary Episcopal Church was built in 1894–1895; the New York Times called it a "handsome new house of worship". During its peak as an escape for the wealth of New York four large resort hotels would be built in Summit, the largest, Beechwood Hotel, had over 200 rooms and one of the first elevators in the state.

=== 20th century ===
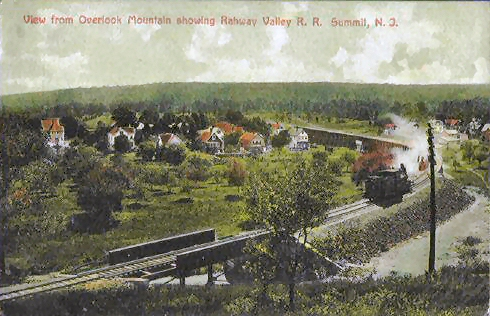
The Rahway Valley Railroad at Summit c. 1910s

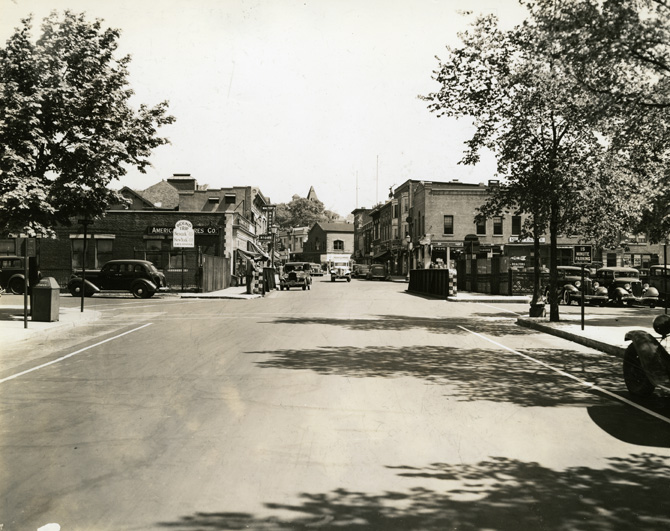
View looking North across Lackawanna Railroad Bridge into Business Section, c. 1940

In 1906 the Overlook Medical Center opened in the city while in 1912 a YMCA opened. Silk weaving, which had thrived as an industry in the late 19th century, declined in the early decades of the 20th. In 1915, there was a strike at the Summit Silk Company on Weaver Street. In the early 20th century, there was much building; in 1909, one report suggested at least 40 residences were being built (some with stables) with costs varying from $4,500 to $45,000, making it "one of the greatest periods of building activity this place, the Hill City, has known."

A new railway was constructed from what was then-called New Orange. The Rahway Valley Railroad connected Summit with the Delaware, Lackawanna and Western Railroad (DL&W). In the early 20th century, both freight and passenger service were offered by this line. (Although in 2009, Union County was exploring the possibility of reactivating the long-dormant line for freight traffic.) A trolley line called the Morris County Traction Company, once ran a passenger trolley through Summit to/from Newark and Morris County, in the early part of the 20th century. Broad Street in Summit was designed and built for the trolley, which is why it is wider and straighter than most streets in the city. Portions of the rails could still be seen on it as late as the 1980s.

Relations between city authorities and businesses have not always been smooth; in 1898, city authorities and the New York and New Jersey Telephone Company had disputes about wires and telephone poles; the city acted and "wires and cables of the company were cut from the poles." There were disputes between Summit's commuters and the Lackawanna railroad about walkways; in one incident in 1905, "a number of passengers seeking to board the 6:35 train found their way barred. They made a united rush, and when the dust cleared away, the door wasn't there. It is said the company will put the door back. The commuters say they will remove it as often as it is replaced."

Following World War II, the city experienced a building boom as living outside New York City and commuting to work became more common and the population of New Jersey grew. At this point, Summit took on its suburban character of tree lined streets and architect-designed houses that it is known for today.

In 1974 there was a lawsuit to split "East Summit" off as its own municipality. Until 1973 the city had been divided into two wards, east and west, by the Erie Lackawanna Railroad tracks. Right before the 1973 municipal election new ward districts where determined that overrode the preexisting geographic boundaries in order to make the two wards roughly equal in population. Following a sweeping Republican victory in the election, the citizens of the eastern portion of the city claimed they had been gerrymandered by the city's Republican leadership in mayor Elmer J. Bennett and council president Frank Lehr. The eastern half of the city was more ethnically diverse and with a predominately Democratic voter base. As such Joseph R. Angelo was proclaimed the "Mayor of East Summit" and citizens sued the municipal government. The lawsuit to split the city in half, Mosely v. Kates, got as far as the Supreme Court of New Jersey which ultimately ruled in favor of the defendants and the city was kept whole.

In the late 1970s, Summit had a mini-bus system, with three long circular routes through most parts of Summit that were primarily designed to bring commuters to the railroad station downtown. The Velvet Underground played their first paid concert at Summit High School on December 11, 1965. The headlining act for that concert was a local band, The Myddle Class.

In 1996 a new City Hall was built around the existing Police Department.

=== 21st century ===
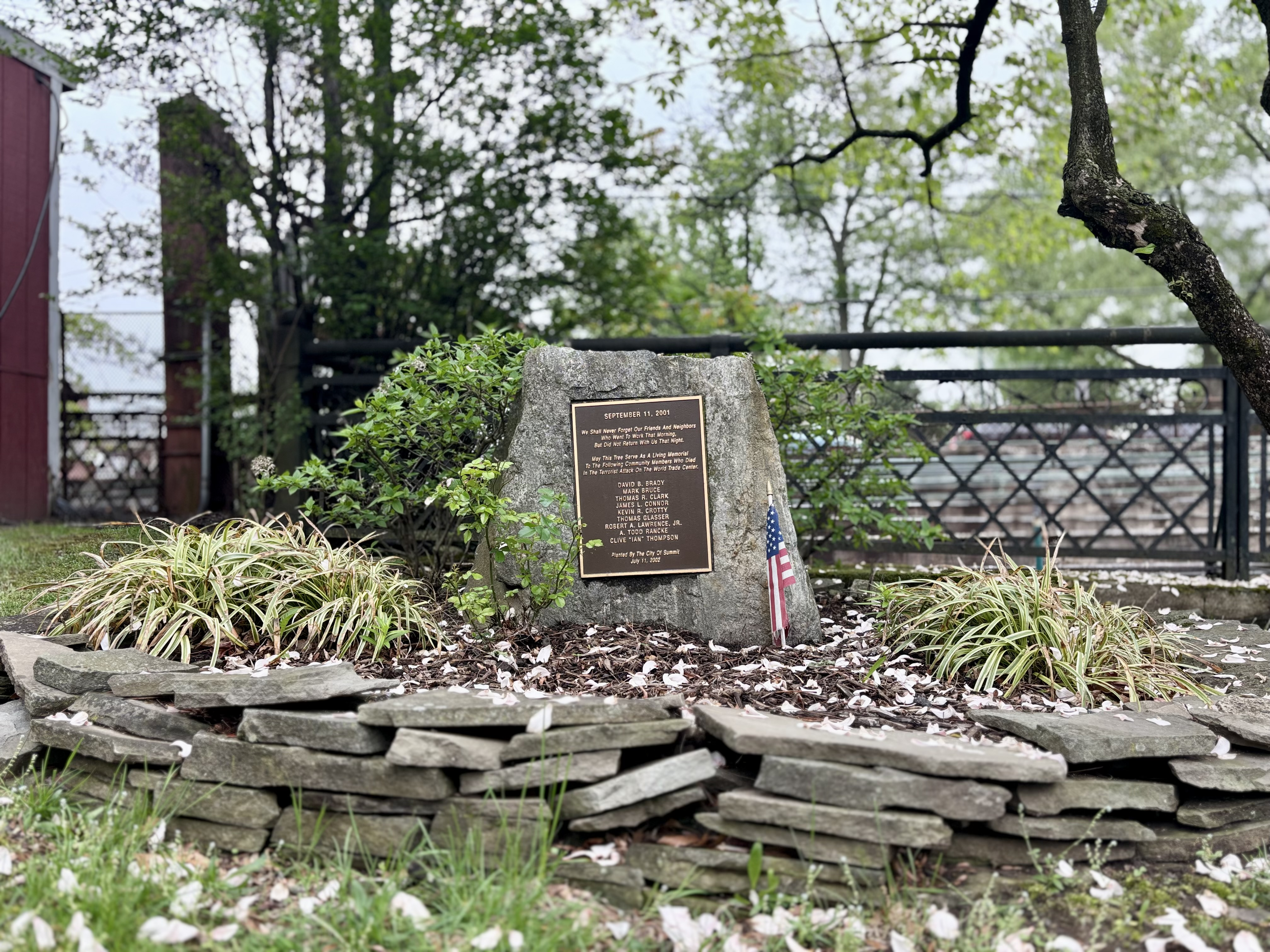
Summit's 9/11 memorial, located next to the Summit train station

10 residents of Summit died in the September 11 terrorist attacks. Many worked in the World Trade Center, and commuted by rail to Hoboken. A few days after the attacks, townspeople assembled on the town green while a minister "called out the names of a dozen residents still unaccounted for after Tuesday's attack on the World Trade Center. Others in the crowd of nearly 2,000 called out names he had left out." A few World Trade Center firms moved to Summit.

Since its incorporation, Summit had been a stronghold of the Republican Party, never having a Democratic mayor, or any democratic members of the city council. This changed in 2001 with the election of Democrat Jordan Glatt to the Summit Common Council as Councilman-At-Large. Glatt would then go on to be elected Summit's 27th, and first Democratic, mayor in 2003, marking a shift in the city becoming politically competitive between the two parties.

In 2005, star baseball athlete Willie Wilson and former Summit graduate returned to Summit High School. Wilson said: "To me, Summit is a special place ... It's where it all began and I have great memories. This is where I want to help kids and youth baseball, and I want my own son and daughter to come and help me create something here." During the economic downturn of 2008–2009, Summit was listed as #6 on a list of American communities "likely to be pummeled by the economic crisis." Crime is generally not bad in the city; the summer 2010 assault of Abelino Mazariego-Torres during a robbery attempt gone awry shocked residents in what one person described as a "very small and very peaceful town." Several youths were charged in the murder.

Summit has consistently ranked high in NJMonthly's biennial Top 100 Towns. In 2019, Summit was ranked the second best place to live.

== Geography ==
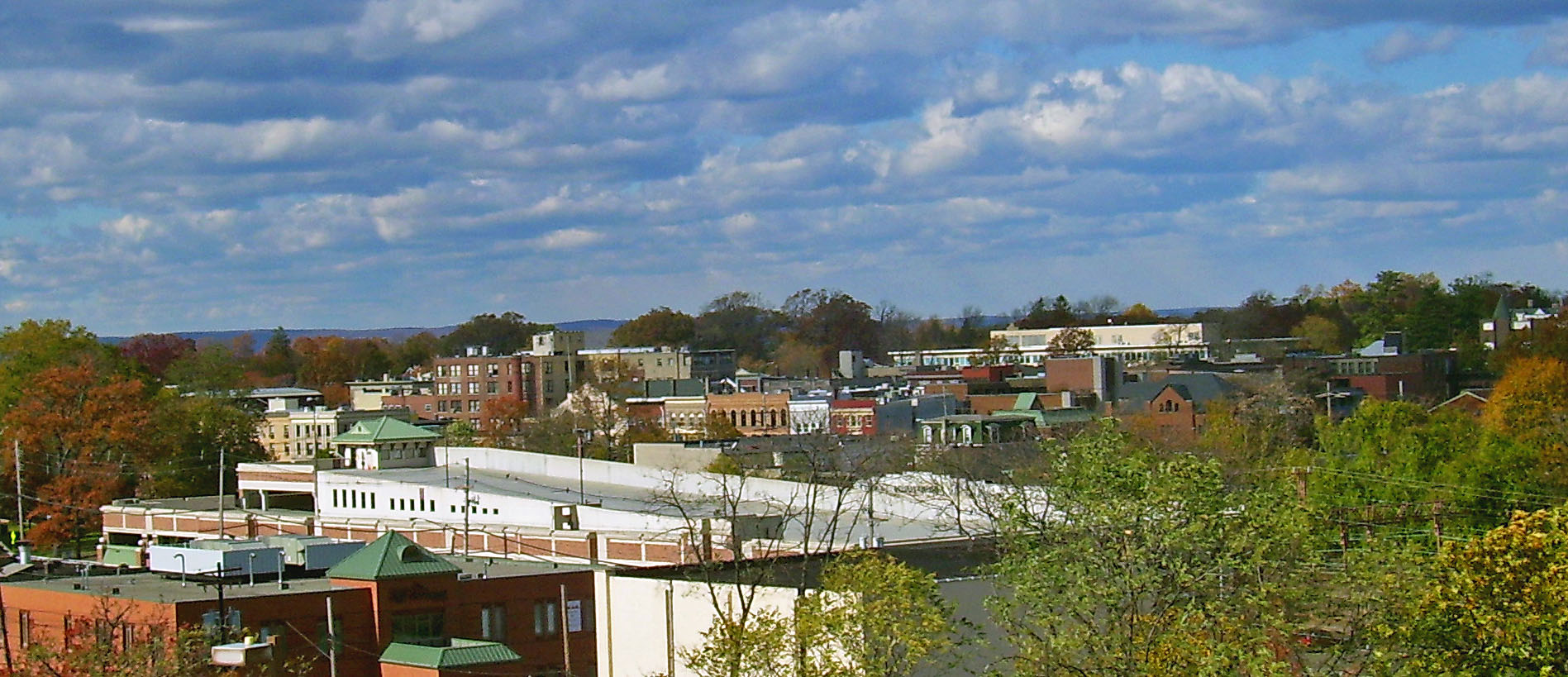
Downtown Summit from the southeast

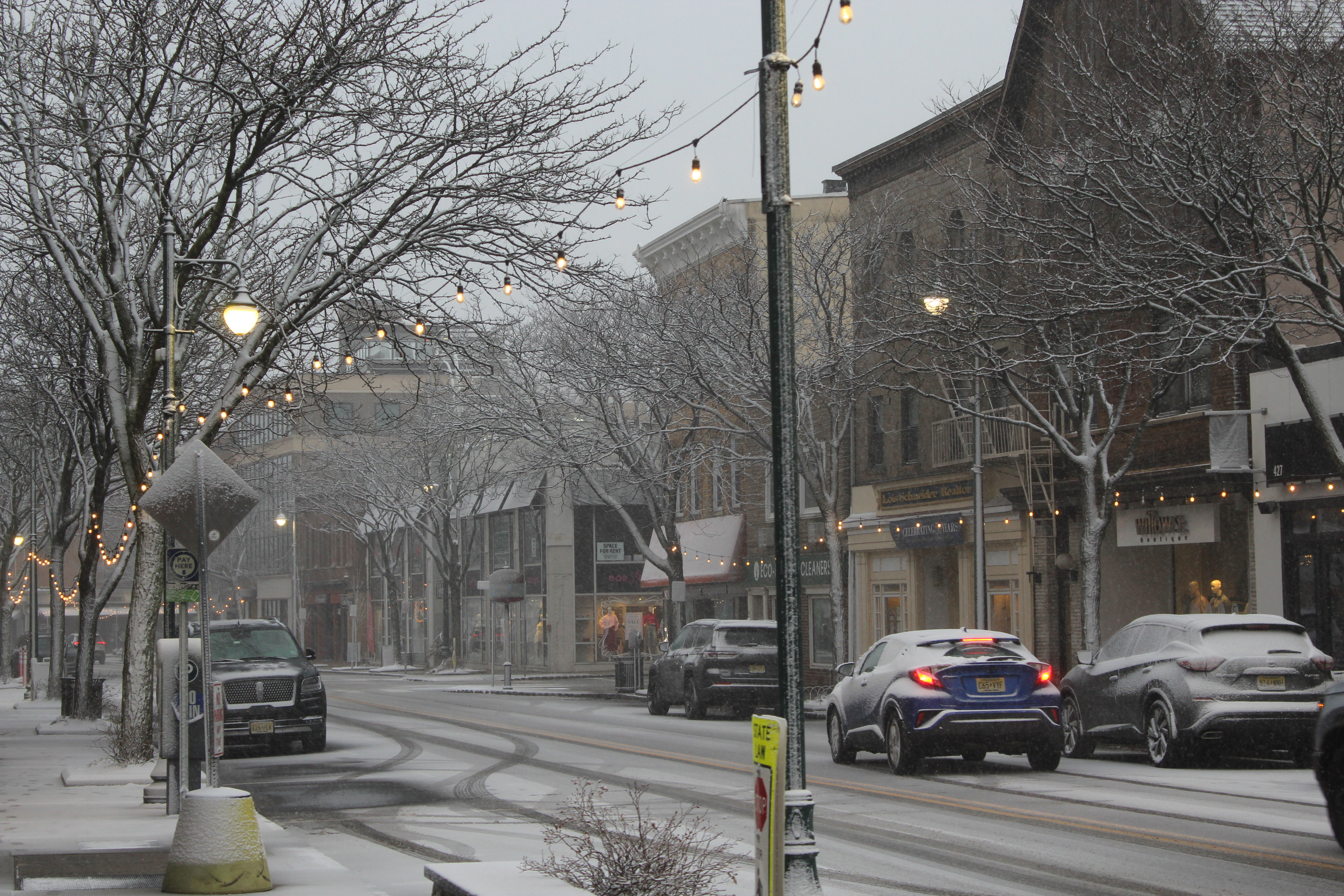
Main downtown during snowfall

According to the United States Census Bureau, the city had a total area of 6.05 square miles (15.66 km^{2}), including 5.99 square miles (15.52 km^{2}) of land and 0.05 square miles (0.13 km^{2}) of water (0.84%). It is about 20 miles (32 km) west of Manhattan.

Springfield Avenue is the city's main street.

Unincorporated communities, localities and place names located partially or completely within the city include Brantwood Park and Tall Oaks.

It is bordered to the northeast by Millburn in Essex County, to the northwest by Chatham Borough and Chatham Township, both in Morris County, to the west by New Providence, to the southwest by Berkeley Heights, to the south by Mountainside and to the southeast by Springfield Township.

=== Climate ===
Summit has warm, humid summers and cold winters typical of northern New Jersey. July is the warmest month, with average high temperatures around 84°F (29°C) and lows near 69°F (21°C), while January is the coldest, with highs around 38°F (3°C) and lows near 25°F (−4°C). The city receives approximately 45 inches (1,150 mm) of precipitation a year, distributed fairly evenly across the seasons, along with an estimated 44 inches (112 cm) of snow in a typical winter, most of which falls in January and February.

== Demographics ==
Historical population
Census	Pop.	Note	%±
1870	1,176		—
1880	1,910		62.4%
1890	3,502		83.4%
1900	5,302		51.4%
1910	7,500		41.5%
1920	10,174		35.7%
1930	14,556		43.1%
1940	16,165		11.1%
1950	17,929		10.9%
1960	23,677		32.1%
1970	23,620		−0.2%
1980	21,071		−10.8%
1990	19,757		−6.2%
2000	21,131		7.0%
2010	21,457		1.5%
2020	22,719		5.9%
2023 (est.)	22,344		−1.7%
Population sources: 1870–1920; 1870 1880–1890; 1900–1910 1910–1930; 1940–2000 2000; 2010 2020

The city has long been popular with traders, investment bankers, and money managers, with nearly 20% of Summit's residents working in finance and real estate. One report said that Manhattan's financial elite prefers living in Summit because of large houses, great schools, and NJ Transit's rail link to Manhattan's financial district.

=== Racial and ethnic composition ===
Summit city, New Jersey – Racial and ethnic composition Note: the US Census treats Hispanic/Latino as an ethnic category. This table excludes Latinos from the racial categories and assigns them to a separate category. Hispanics/Latinos may be of any race.
Race / Ethnicity (NH = Non-Hispanic)	Pop 2000	Pop 2010	Pop 2020	% 2000	% 2010	% 2020
White alone (NH)	16,926	15,897	15,016	80.10%	74.09%	66.09%
Black or African American alone (NH)	877	933	895	4.15%	4.35%	3.94%
Native American or Alaska Native alone (NH)	10	7	8	0.05%	0.03%	0.04%
Asian alone (NH)	935	1,367	2,371	4.42%	6.37%	10.44%
Native Hawaiian or Pacific Islander alone (NH)	2	0	5	0.01%	0.00%	0.02%
Other race alone (NH)	29	46	126	0.14%	0.21%	0.55%
Mixed race or Multiracial (NH)	202	356	985	0.96%	1.66%	4.34%
Hispanic or Latino (any race)	2,150	2,851	3,313	10.17%	13.29%	14.58%
Total	21,131	21,457	22,719	100.00%	100.00%	100.00%

=== 2020 census ===
As of the 2020 census, Summit had a population of 22,719. The median age was 39.7 years. 27.0% of residents were under the age of 18 and 13.2% of residents were 65 years of age or older. For every 100 females there were 94.8 males, and for every 100 females age 18 and over there were 93.4 males age 18 and over.

100.0% of residents lived in urban areas, while 0.0% lived in rural areas.

There were 7,905 households in Summit, of which 42.9% had children under the age of 18 living in them. Of all households, 62.1% were married-couple households, 12.1% were households with a male householder and no spouse or partner present, and 22.0% were households with a female householder and no spouse or partner present. About 21.4% of all households were made up of individuals and 10.3% had someone living alone who was 65 years of age or older.

There were 8,365 housing units, of which 5.5% were vacant. The homeowner vacancy rate was 1.0% and the rental vacancy rate was 4.5%.

Racial composition as of the 2020 census
Race	Number	Percent
White	15,483	68.2%
Black or African American	940	4.1%
American Indian and Alaska Native	57	0.3%
Asian	2,382	10.5%
Native Hawaiian and Other Pacific Islander	9	0.0%
Some other race	1,173	5.2%
Two or more races	2,675	11.8%
Hispanic or Latino (of any race)	3,313	14.6%

=== 2010 census ===
The 2010 United States census counted 21,457 people, 7,708 households, and 5,519 families in the city. The population density was 3,578.9 per square mile (1,381.8/km^{2}). There were 8,190 housing units at an average density of 1,366.0 per square mile (527.4/km^{2}). The racial makeup was 83.54% (17,926) White, 4.52% (970) Black or African American, 0.14% (30) Native American, 6.38% (1,368) Asian, 0.01% (3) Pacific Islander, 2.84% (610) from other races, and 2.56% (550) from two or more races. Hispanic or Latino of any race were 13.29% (2,851) of the population.

Of the 7,708 households, 39.6% had children under the age of 18; 60.6% were married couples living together; 8.2% had a female householder with no husband present and 28.4% were non-families. Of all households, 23.4% were made up of individuals and 10.2% had someone living alone who was 65 years of age or older. The average household size was 2.77 and the average family size was 3.29.

29.0% of the population were under the age of 18, 4.9% from 18 to 24, 25.6% from 25 to 44, 28.6% from 45 to 64, and 11.9% who were 65 years of age or older. The median age was 39.7 years. For every 100 females, the population had 96.8 males. For every 100 females ages 18 and older there were 92.0 males.

The Census Bureau's 2006–2010 American Community Survey showed that (in 2010 inflation-adjusted dollars) median household income was $109,602 and the median family income was $145,083. Males had a median income of $109,608 (+/− $15,245) versus $61,368 (+/− $8,854) for females. The per capita income for the city was $70,574. About 4.4% of families and 6.5% of the population were below the poverty line, including 7.4% of those under age 18 and 5.9% of those age 65 or over.

=== 2000 census ===
At the 2000 United States census there were 21,131 people, 7,897 households and 5,606 families residing in the city. The population density was 3,490.7 inhabitants per square mile (1,347.8/km^{2}). There were 8,146 housing units at an average density of 1,345.7 per square mile (519.6/km^{2}). The racial makeup of the city was 87.77% White, 4.33% African American, 0.09% Native American, 4.45% Asian, 0.01% Pacific Islander, 1.70% from other races, and 1.65% from two or more races. Hispanic or Latino of any race were 10.17% of the population.

== Economy ==
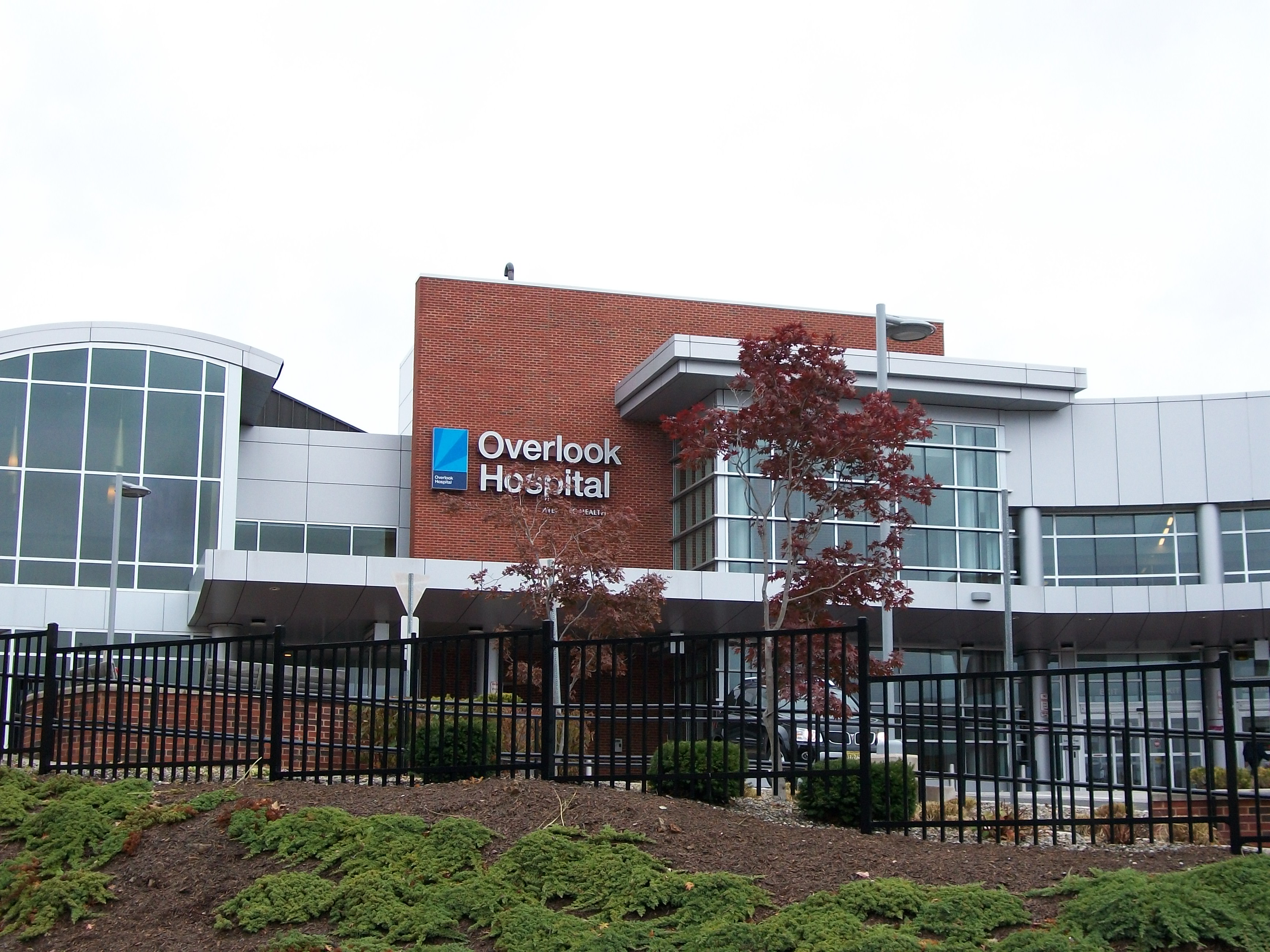
Overlook Medical Center is on a hill above the town with views of the Manhattan skyline

Corporate residents of Summit include:

- Bristol Myers Squibb is a biotechnology company and the largest corporate taxpayer in Summit. The company purchased a campus on the western part of Summit, formerly owned by Celgene, and before them Merck & Co. (formerly Schering Plough pharmaceuticals until a 2009 merger); these facilities were previously home to Novartis (formerly Ciba-Geigy).
- Overlook Medical Center is located on a hill with views of the Manhattan skyline and is operated by the Atlantic Health System and features the Atlantic Neuroscience Institute, the Carol G. Simon Cancer Center and the Gagnon Cardiovascular Institute.
- Whiptail Technologies is a maker of solid state storage appliances.
- Hibernia Atlantic is headquartered in Summit and is a transatlantic submarine cable network provider.

== Arts and culture ==
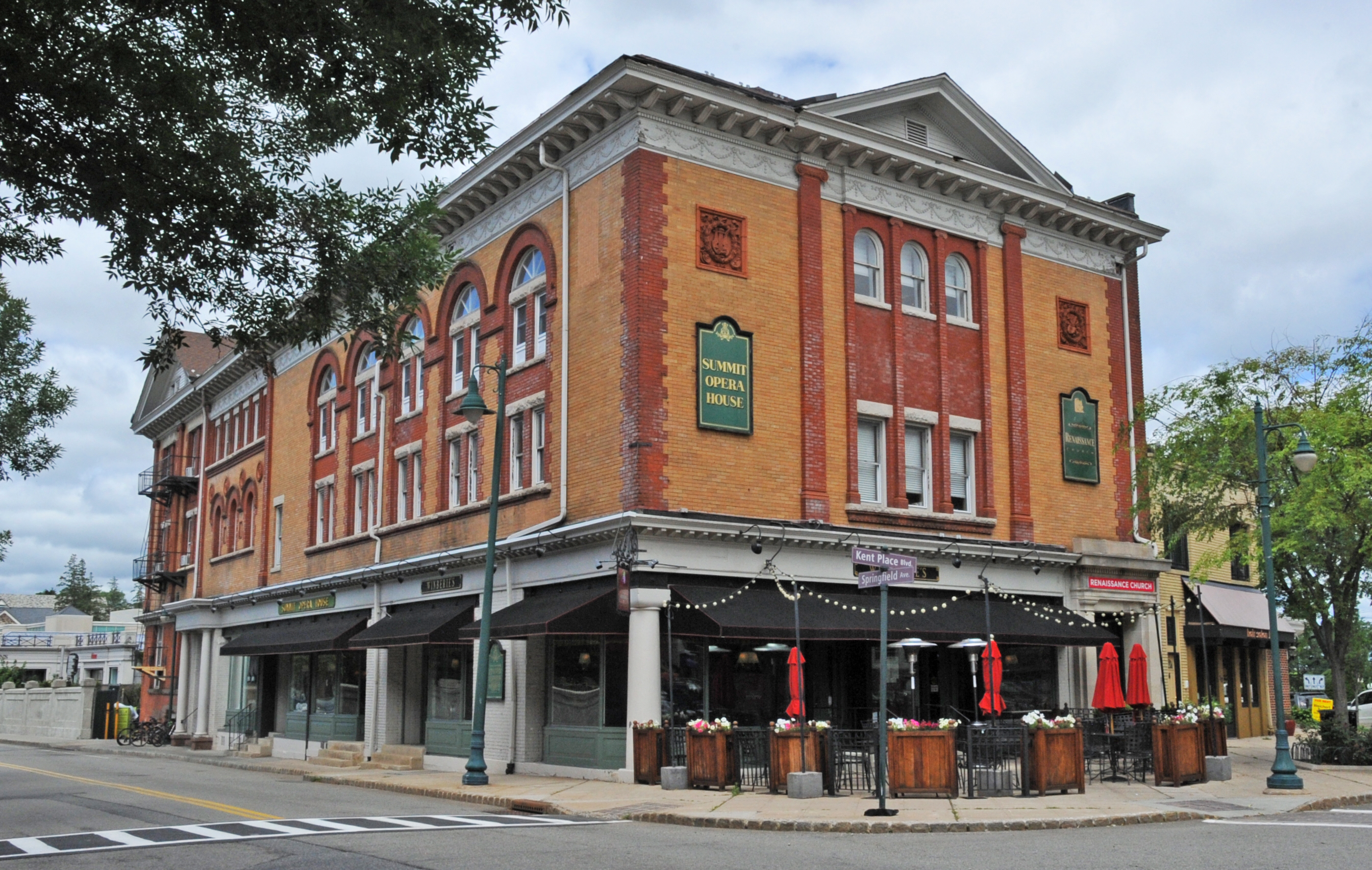
Opera house

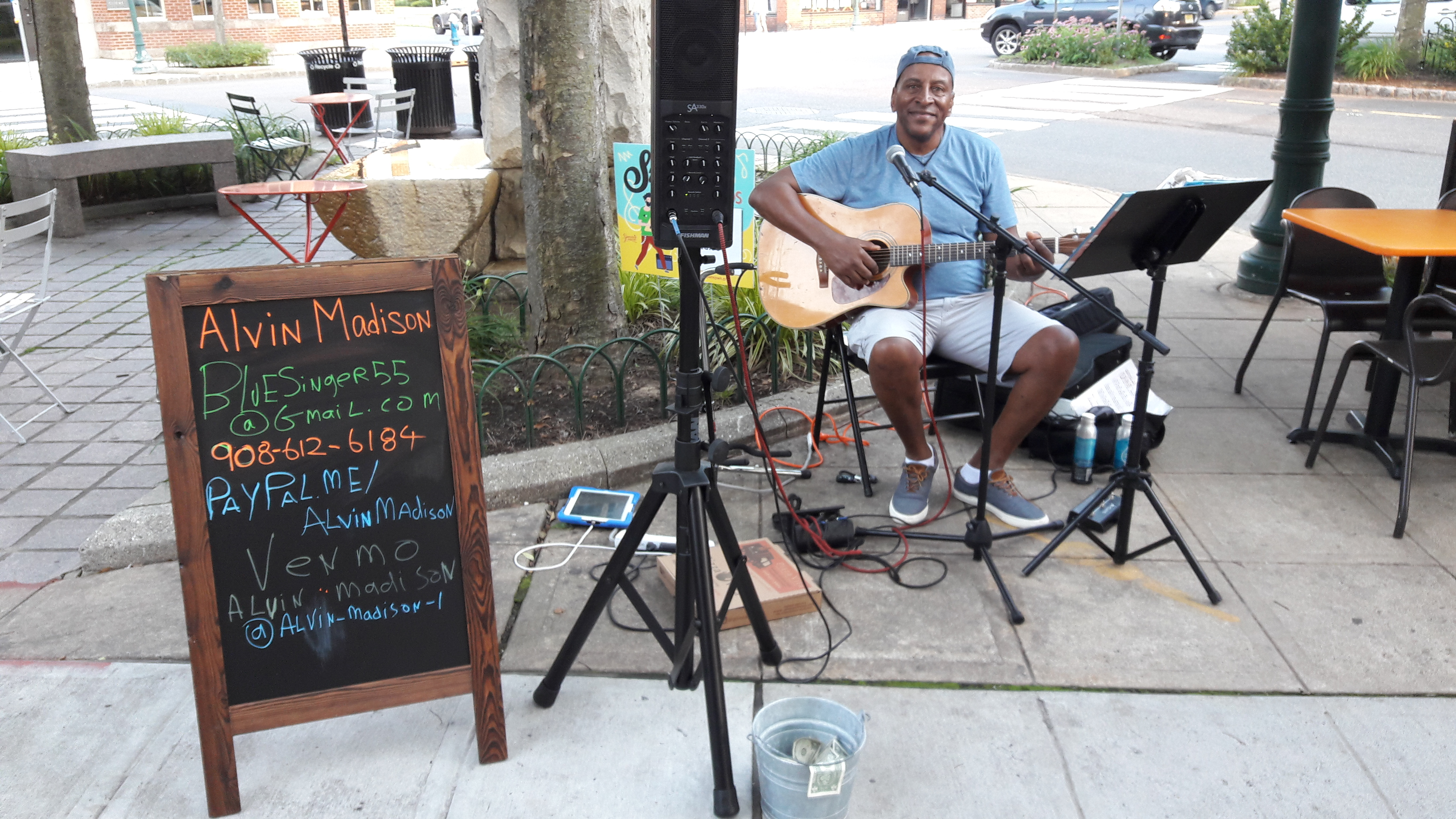
In the summer of 2021, the city supports musical artists performing downtown for diners with its Summit Street Sounds program. In photo: singer-songwriter and blues singer Alvin Madison performs.

The Summit Opera House was built in the 1890s by the Woman's Christian Temperance Union as meeting place and dry entertainment hall. It currently houses Winberie's restaurant on the ground floor, and a church, office space, and apartments on the upper floors. It is located at Springfield Avenue and Kent Place Boulevard in downtown Summit.

The Summit Playhouse mounts live dramatic performances.

The Visual Arts Center of New Jersey, on Elm Street diagonally across from the Summit Middle School, is a professionally recognized regional art center with an art school and an exhibition program.

Horseback riding is available at the Watchung stables, located in the Watchung Reservation since the 1930s.

The city supports a program of public art organized by Summit Public Art, a volunteer-based city organization founded in 2002, whose mission is to bring art to public spaces throughout Summit. In 2019, the city was encouraging artists, including singer-songwriters, to perform at local venues in the downtown area, as part of its Summit Street Sounds program.

In October 2024, President Russell M. Nelson of The Church of Jesus Christ of Latter-day Saints announced that Summit would be the site of the Church's first temple in New Jersey.

== Parks and recreation ==
Renovated and expanded in 2019, the Summit Community Center has two gymnasiums, a senior citizens lounge, a meeting room, a game room, and a small kitchen.

=== Local parks and reserves ===
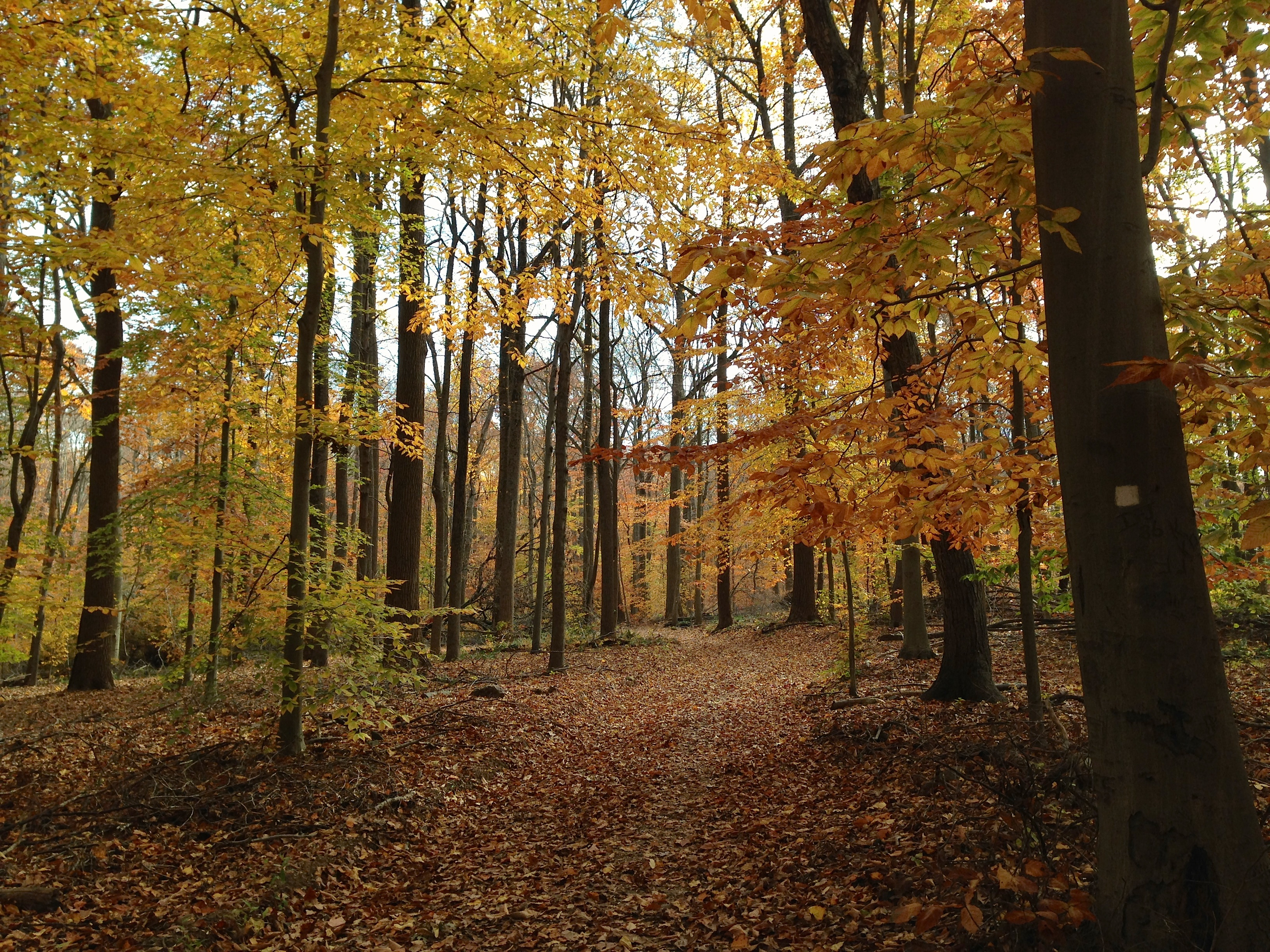
The Watchung Reservation in autumn.

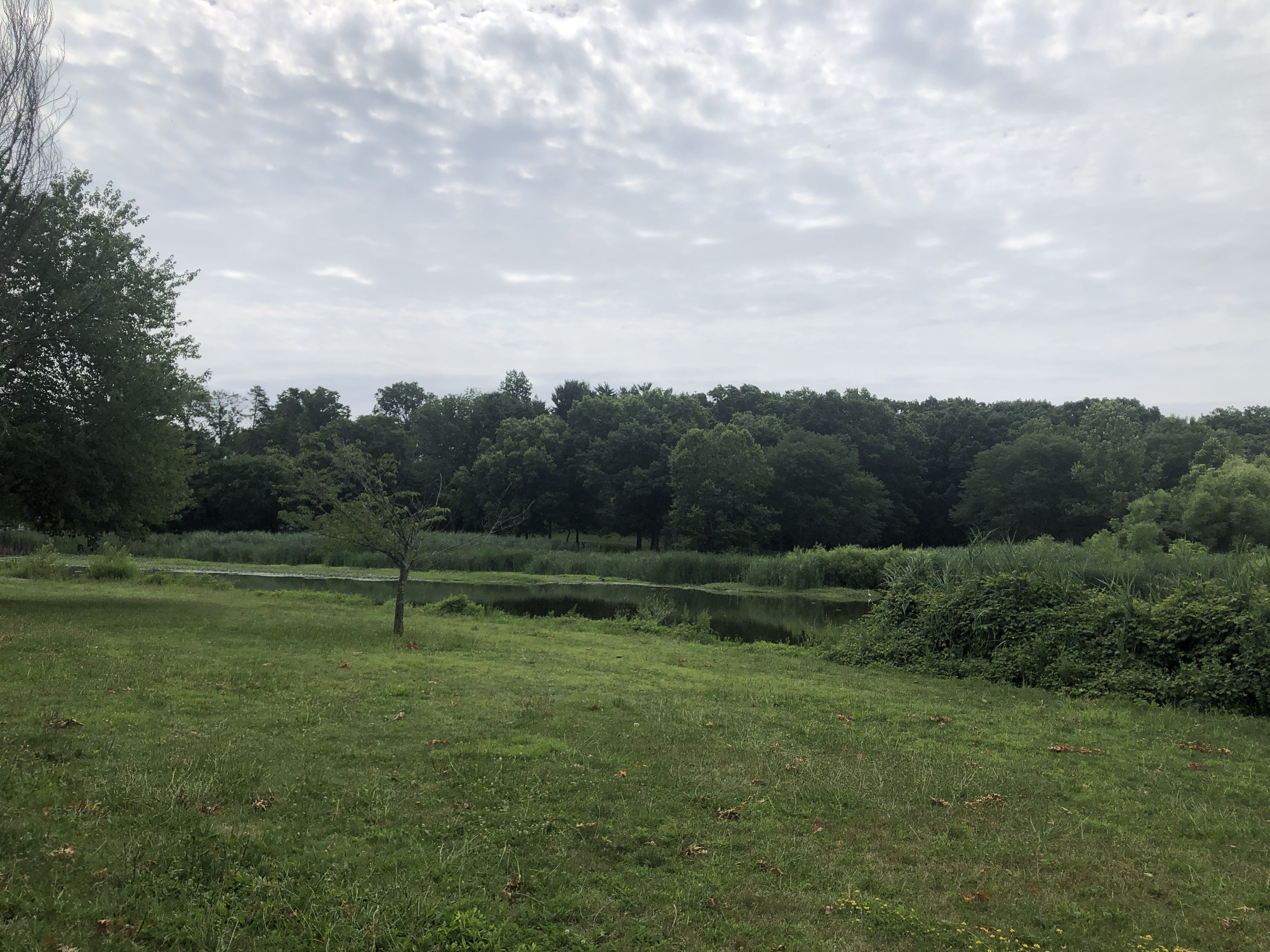
Briant Park in summer.

- Reeves-Reed Arboretum is a suburban conservancy dedicated to environmental and horticultural education for children and adults and enjoyment of nature through the professional care and preservation of a historic country estate.
- Briant Park, owned by Union County and located in Summit and Springfield Township, covers 30.3 acres (12.3 ha). It is bordered along its western side by Park Drive, along the east by Shunpike Road and on the northern side by Briant Parkway and Morris Avenue. A brook cuts through the park, and the park is connected via a greenway to Hidden Valley Park in the southeast. There is a pond for ice-skating and fishing, some picnic areas, athletic fields, and a fitness trail."
- "Hidden Valley Park, owned by Union County, New Jersey and located in the City of Summit and Springfield Township. The park contains 70.4 acres (28.5 ha) of basically undeveloped land that is connected via a greenway along Orchard Street to Briant Park. Hidden Valley Park is bordered along its southern edge by Interstate 78 and along the west by the residential neighborhoods along Baltusrol Road and Morris Avenue." Its eastern border is adjacent to the now-closed Houdaille Quarry which is now parkland owned by the county.
- Passaic River Parkway, owned by Union County, New Jersey, includes six small park areas along the Passaic River in western Union County (Summit, New Providence, Berkeley Heights). These areas are undeveloped with no facilities, and covers a total of 133.4 acres (54.0 ha). Area #1 in Summit and New Providence is located between Route 124 and the railroad tracks. The northern area of the park bordered by Morris County, and the southern area is bordered by River Road in Summit.
- Watchung Reservation is a 1,945-acre (787 ha) nature reserve and recreation area administered by the Union County Parks Department that is bounded by Summit, Mountainside, Berkeley Heights, Scotch Plains and Springfield Township. The reservation consists mainly of the upper valley of Blue Brook, between the ridges of First Watchung Mountain and Second Watchung Mountain. A dam near the headwaters of the creek creates Lake Surprise.

=== Planned rail trail ===
Lines of the abandoned Rahway Valley Railroad

As of 2022, construction was underway on the Summit Park Line, a 1.2-mile (1.9 km) pedestrian linear park that will run from Morris Avenue by the Overlook Medical Center to Briant Park, mostly along a segment of the abandoned Rahway Valley Railroad (RVRR). The park will connect the central business district, another public park, walkways, and nature areas while offering a view of the Manhattan skyline. Approved in December 2020, the park's creation is fully funded by foundation grants and individual and corporate donations. Its creation is guided by the non-profit Summit Park Line Foundation. A footbridge over Morris Avenue in Summit was installed in October 2022.

Beyond its Summit portion, area residents have pushed for the full abandoned RVRR Main Line to become a rail trail. Doing so would create a 7.3-mile (11.7 km) pedestrian linear park along the RVRR main line from Summit to the southwest edge of Roselle Park and provide a protected greenway to connect several county parks akin to the High Line in New York City. The rail trail would run eastbound from the Overlook Medical Center on the edge of downtown Summit as the Summit Park Line and then head south along the old railbed through Springfield, Union, and Kenilworth and ending at the southwest edge of Roselle Park at the Cranford border.

In 2022, as the Summit Park Line proceeds, advocates have also been pushing for immediate development of the RVRR Main Line portion south of Route 22, running southbound past the Galloping Hill Golf Course through Kenilworth and Roselle Park. The New Jersey Department of Transportation, which owns the railbed, has been working to clear its southern end for possible use as a trail. Were the rail trail to expand even farther, beyond the 7.3 mile RVRR Main Line railbed, it could conceivably connect in the Cranford area with the unused Staten Island Rapid Transit line, eventually connecting to a bridge over the Arthur Kill in Linden.

== Government ==
=== Local government ===
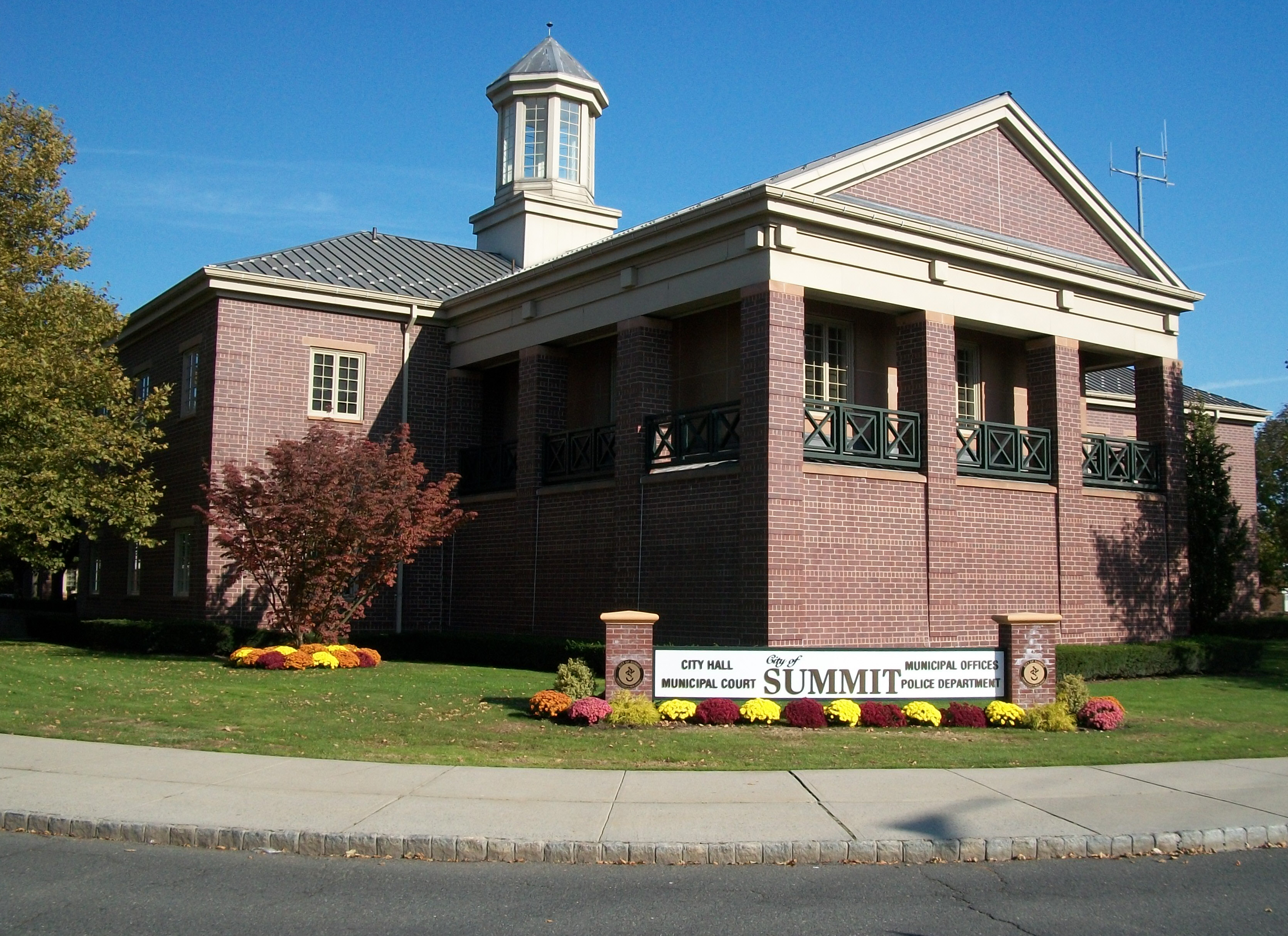
City Hall at the intersection of Springfield Avenue and Morris Avenue has the city's police station, municipal court, municipal departments, and other offices

Summit operates under the city form of municipal government; one of 15 (of the 564) municipalities statewide that use this form. On April 11, 1899, Summit voters adopted as the Charter of the City of Summit the Statute of 1899 applicable to cities of less than 12,000 population. On December 15, 1987, the New Jersey Legislature enacted a law that repealed the original charter, retaining those sections not covered by general law that were specific to Summit. The charter now specifies that "1: The council may, by referendum, change the term of the councilman at large from a two year term to a four year term. 2: Resolutions adopted by the council do not have to be approved by the mayor. 3: The council pro tempore shall be the acting mayor in the mayor's absence due to sickness or other cause. 4: The municipality may appoint an administrator in accordance with the provisions of N.J.S. 40A:9-136. 5: The municipality may adopt an administrative code."

The mayor is elected by the city for a four-year term and is the city's official spokesman and chief elected official. The mayor can appoint various officials, including the chief of police and the board of education. The mayor serves as the chairman of the Board of School Estimate and on various committees, and has the right to speak at common council meetings, but can only vote to break ties in the council. This bully pulpit role is considered the mayor's strongest power.

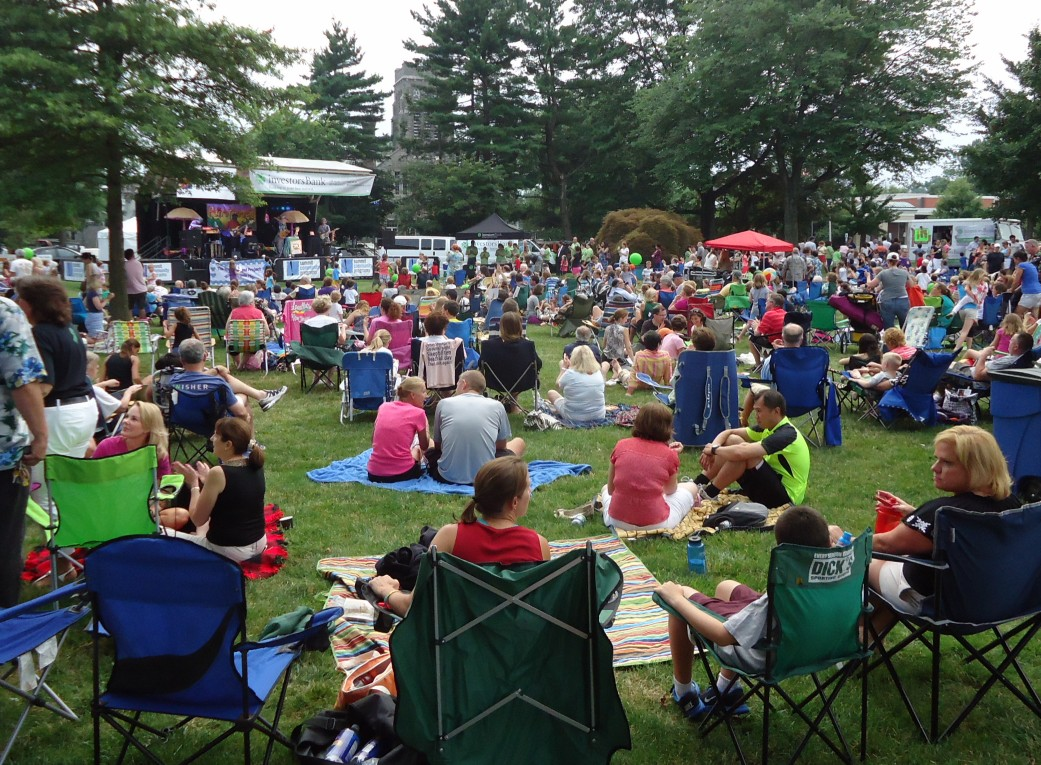
The city sponsors free outdoor concerts during summer months

The common council has the chief policy making and administrative oversight role in city government. The council approves all laws and adopts the city budget. The council also oversees the work of city department heads. The council is comprised of three members from Ward I and three members from Ward II plus one member elected at-large. The at-large member serves a two-year term of office, while the six ward members serve three-year terms on a staggered basis, with one seat in each ward up for election each year. The council elects from its membership a president and a president pro tem, each serving a one-year term. The president presides at all council meetings, and the president pro tem presides in the president's absence. The president pro tem also serves as acting mayor in the absence of the mayor.

As of 2026, the mayor of Summit is Republican Elizabeth Fagan, whose term of office ends December 31, 2027. Members of the common council are Council President Claire Toth (D, 2027; Second Ward), President Pro Tem Michelle Kalmanson (D, 2027; First Ward), Jamel Boyer (R, 2026; Second Ward), Dan Crisafulli (D, 2027; At Large), Chantal Landman (D, 2028; Second Ward), Jaclyn Lasaracina (D, 2028; First Ward) and Bob Pawlowski (R, 2026; First Ward).

In February 2021, the common council selected Lisa K. Allen from a list of three candidates nominated by the Republican municipal committee to fill the Second Ward seat expiring in December 2022 that had been held by Stephen Bowman until he resigned from office. Allen served on an interim basis until the November 2021 general election, when she was elected to serve the balance of the term of office.

Summit had been a stronghold of the Republican Party for years. From 1921 to 2001, no Democrats served in elected office and very few ran for office. The real elections occurred in the Republican primary. In 2001, two Democratic candidates were elected to council: Michel Bitritto won in Ward I and Jordan Glatt won the at-large seat. Summit had never elected a Democrat as mayor until 2003, when Jordan Glatt was elected.

In November 2011, Republicans swept all the open seats, with Ellen Dickson elected mayor and Gregory Drummond, Patrick Hurley and Robert Rubino sweeping the three council seats, giving full control of city government back to the Republican party.

Democrats began making inroads in the ensuing years, with the election of Nora Radest, a Democrat, for mayor in 2015, along with two Democratic council members (David Naidu and Richard Sun, who was the youngest-ever elected city official at the age of 24). In November 2017, for the first time in Summit's history, Democrats were elected to hold the majority of seats on council.

In November 2019, Susan Hairston was sworn in to the First Ward seat expiring in December 2020 that became vacant following the death of Matthew Gould. In 2020, she was elected to the same seat, becoming the first African-American council member in city history.

In November 2023, Republicans swept the local election, winning the mayoralty and three city council seats, bringing the composition to five Republicans and two Democrats. In this 2023 election, Republican Ward 2 Councilmember Jamel Boyer became the first African American male elected to the city's Common Council.

Until December 2024, Michael F. Rogers was the city administrator of Summit. In this role, he directed day-to-day operations of city government and the city departments.

In November 2025's election in Summit, Democrats won all seats up for re-election, winning 2 new council seats (at-large and Ward 1) and brought Summit's upcoming city council split to 5 Democrats and 2 Republicans. The new councilmembers include Dan Crisafulli (D, At-large), Jaclyn Lasaracina (D, Ward 1), and Chantal Landman, (D, Ward 2).

The Department of Community Services is responsible for engineering, public works and code administration. The engineering division manages city infrastructure such as roads, curbs, sewers, and provide support to the planning and zoning boards. Public works maintains streets, trees, traffic signs, public parks, traffic islands, playgrounds, public buildings, support vehicles, equipment, and has other responsibilities. The city runs a municipal disposal area / solid waste transfer station where recyclables are collected, including bulky trash; residents must have a town-generated sticker on their cars to use this facility. Certain trees require government permission in the form of a permit before being removed. Summit provides for snow plowing 66 miles (106 km) of roads, covering all city streets, except for county roads. The city has embarked on a program of "Bringing Art to Public Spaces in Summit"; this program, established in 2002, has placed sculptures at different venues around the town and is supported in part by private donations. The Summit Chamber of Commerce advertises the town on cable television.

In 2018, the city had an average property tax bill of $17,919, the highest in the county, compared to an average bill of $8,767 statewide.

=== Federal, state and county representation ===
Summit is located in the 7th Congressional District and is part of New Jersey's 21st state legislative district.

For the 119th United States Congress, New Jersey's 7th congressional district is represented by Thomas Kean Jr. (R, Westfield). New Jersey is represented in the United States Senate by Democrats Cory Booker (Newark, term ends 2027) and Andy Kim (Moorestown, term ends 2031).

For the 2026–2027 session, the 21st legislative district of the New Jersey Legislature is represented in the State Senate by Jon Bramnick (R, Westfield) and in the General Assembly by Vincent Kearney (D, Garwood) and Andrew Macurdy (D, Summit).

Union County is governed by a Board of County Commissioners, whose nine members are elected at-large to three-year terms of office on a staggered basis with three seats coming up for election each year, with an appointed County Manager overseeing the day-to-day operations of the county. At an annual reorganization meeting held in the beginning of January, the board selects a Chair and Vice Chair from among its members. As of 2026, Union County's County Commissioners are:

Vice Chair Rebecca Williams (D, Plainfield, 2028), Chairman Joesph Bodek (D, Linden, 2026), James E. Baker Jr. (D, Rahway, 2027), Michele Delisfort (D, Union Township, 2026), Lourdes M. Leon (D, Elizabeth, 2026), Alexander Mirabella (D, Fanwood, 2027) Kimberly Palmieri-Mouded (D, Westfield, 2027). Stanley J. Neron (D, Elizabeth, 2028), Joseph Signorello III (D, Roselle Park, 2028)

Constitutional officers elected on a countywide basis are: Clerk Vacant - Incumbent Clerk Joanne Rajoppi (D, Union Township) died on July 16, 2026. Her death triggered a special election for a full five-year term to be held concurrently with the November 2026 general election. Deputy Clerk Clara Fernández assumes the powers of the office until the vacancy is filled. Sheriff Peter Corvelli (D, Kenilworth, 2026) and Surrogate Christopher E. Hudak (D, Clark, 2027).

=== Politics ===
As of March 2021, there were a total of 16,171 registered voters in Summit, of which 6,048 (37.4% vs. 49.6% countywide) were registered as Democrats, 4,014 (24.8% vs. 15.8%) were registered as Republicans and 6,109 (37.7% vs. 34.5%) were registered as Unaffiliated. Among the city's 2020 Census population, 68.6% (vs. 58.9% in Union County) were registered to vote, including 94.9% of those ages 18 and over (vs. 77% countywide).

United States presidential election results for Summit
Year	Republican		Democratic		Third party(ies)	
Year	No.	%	No.	%	No.	%
2024	4,176	34.48%	7,702	63.60%	233	1.92%
2020	3,846	30.64%	8,500	67.71%	208	1.66%
2016	3,210	34.12%	5,776	61.40%	421	4.48%
2012	4,859	49.26%	4,895	49.63%	109	1.11%
2008	4,700	44.31%	5,820	54.86%	88	0.83%
2004	5,183	50.19%	5,068	49.08%	75	0.73%

In the 2025 gubernatorial election, Democrat Mikie Sherrill received 6,015 votes (60.3% vs. 67.1% countywide), ahead of Republican Jack Ciattarelli with 3,922 votes (39.3% vs. 32.1%), and other candidates with 39 votes (0.4% vs. 0.8%), among the 9,976 ballots cast by the city's registered voters. In the 2021 gubernatorial election, Democrat Phil Murphy received 4,393 votes (57.0% vs. 61.6% countywide), ahead of Republican Jack Ciattarelli with 3,256 votes (42.2% vs. 37.6%), and other candidates with 60 votes (0.8% vs. 0.8%), among the 7,785 ballots cast by the city's 16,758 registered voters, for a turnout of 46.5%. In the 2017 gubernatorial election, Democrat Phil Murphy received 3,886 votes (56.4% vs. 65.2% countywide), ahead of Republican Kim Guadagno with 2,891 votes (42.0% vs. 32.6%), and other candidates with 112 votes (1.6% vs. 2.1%), among the 7,040 ballots cast by the city's 15,131 registered voters, for a turnout of 46.5%. In the 2013 gubernatorial election, Republican Chris Christie received 68.1% of the vote (3,971 cast), ahead of Democrat Barbara Buono with 30.6% (1,785 votes), and other candidates with 1.3% (76 votes), among the 5,928 ballots cast by the city's 14,076 registered voters (96 ballots were spoiled), for a turnout of 42.1%. In the 2009 gubernatorial election, Democrat Jon Corzine was defeated in his hometown when Republican Chris Christie received 3,682 votes (50.3% vs. 41.7% countywide), ahead his 3,014 votes (41.2% vs. 50.6%), Independent Chris Daggett with 543 votes (7.4% vs. 5.9%) and other candidates with 43 votes (0.6% vs. 0.8%), among the 7,323 ballots cast by the city's 13,435 registered voters, yielding a 54.5% turnout (vs. 46.5% in the county).

Gubernatorial election results for Summit
Year	Republican		Democratic		Third party(ies)	
Year	No.	%	No.	%	No.	%
2025	3,922	39.31%	6,015	60.29%	39	0.39%
2021	3,256	42.24%	4,393	56.99%	60	0.78%
2017	2,891	41.97%	3,886	56.41%	112	1.63%
2013	3,971	68.09%	1,785	30.61%	76	1.30%
2009	3,682	50.56%	3,014	41.39%	586	8.05%
2005	3,487	49.24%	3,467	48.96%	128	1.81%

United States Senate election results for Summit1
Year	Republican		Democratic		Third party(ies)	
Year	No.	%	No.	%	No.	%
2024	4,591	38.60%	7,154	60.15%	149	1.25%
2018	3,753	45.17%	4,293	51.67%	263	3.17%
2012	4,568	49.61%	4,469	48.54%	170	1.85%
2006	3,689	51.02%	3,437	47.54%	104	1.44%

United States Senate election results for Summit2
Year	Republican		Democratic		Third party(ies)	
Year	No.	%	No.	%	No.	%
2020	4,531	36.24%	7,872	62.96%	101	0.81%
2014	2,530	47.31%	2,731	51.07%	87	1.63%
2013	1,794	43.29%	2,313	55.82%	37	0.89%
2008	4,852	50.16%	4,677	48.35%	145	1.50%

== Education ==
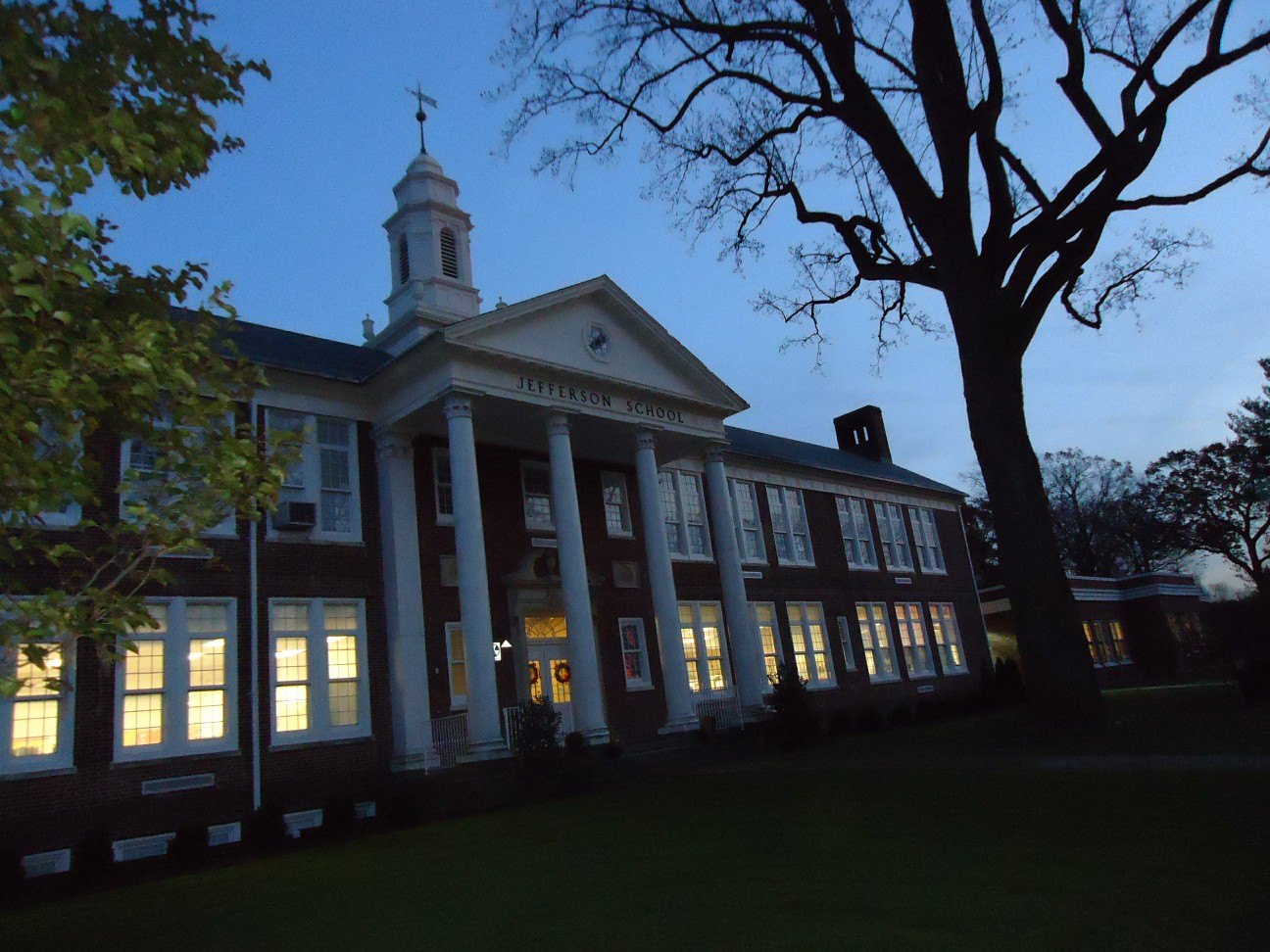
Jefferson School, one of Summit's five elementary schools

Students in pre-kindergarten through twelfth grade are educated by the Summit Public Schools. As of the 2022–23 school year, the district, comprised of nine schools, had an enrollment of 3,950 students and 366.9 classroom teachers (on an FTE basis), for a student–teacher ratio of 10.8:1. Schools in the district (with 2022–23 enrollment data from the National Center for Education Statistics) are Jefferson Primary Center (143 students; in grades PreK-K), Wilson Primary Center (202; PreK-K), Brayton School (304; 1–5), Franklin School (327; 1–5), Jefferson School (215; 1–5), Lincoln-Hubbard School (328; 1–5), Washington School (310; 1–5), Lawton C. Johnson Summit Middle School (942; 6–8) and Summit High School (1,161; 9–12).

The district's board of education is comprised of seven members who set policy and oversee the fiscal and educational operation of the district through its administration. As a Type I school district, the board's trustees are appointed by the mayor to serve three-year terms of office on a staggered basis, with either two or three members up for reappointment each year. Of the more than 600 school districts statewide, Summit is one of about a dozen districts statewide with appointed school boards. The board appoints a superintendent to oversee the district's day-to-day operations and a business administrator to supervise the business functions of the district.

=== Private schools ===
- Kent Place School, founded in 1894, serves girls in preschool through 12th grade.
- Oak Knoll School of the Holy Child (K–6 coed; 7–12 for girls), which operates under the auspices of the Roman Catholic Archdiocese of Newark
- Oratory Preparatory School (7–12) was founded in 1907 as Carlton Academy
- St. Teresa of Avila School (Preschool-K), operated by the Archdiocese of Newark

== Youth sports ==
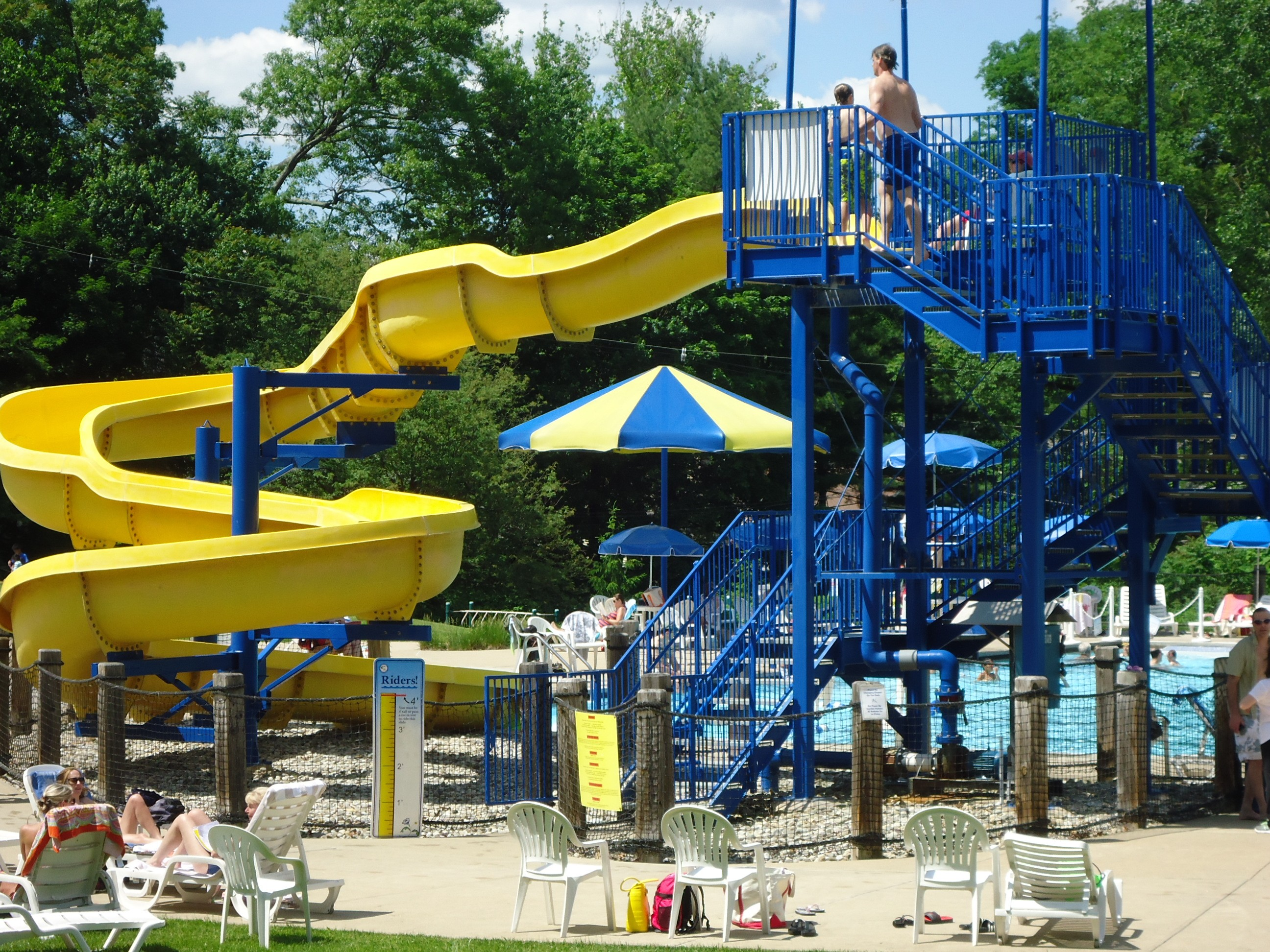
Summit's Family Aquatic Center has a water slide, an Olympic-sized outdoor pool, and the youth swim team is called the Summit Sharks

Summit has sports programs for youth including basketball, baseball, soccer, and football leagues through the Recreation Center. In addition, the city's YMCA organizes sports clinics and teams including the Summit Area YMCA "Seals" Swim Team. Children can play in recreational programs and try out for a traveling soccer program run by the Summit Soccer Club, a nonprofit dedicated to the development of youth soccer in the city. Travel soccer runs for both the fall and spring seasons.

Lacrosse is a popular sport. Summit High School's boys team holds the third-most NJSIAA Boys Group Titles and 11 appearances in the Tournament of Champions, winning in 2009 and 2010 and four times finishing as runner-up. Summit holds the New Jersey state high school record with 68 consecutive victories during 2009 to 2011. In 2012, the team was ranked second in New Jersey and in the top 20 nationally. Beginning in first grade, boys and girls can learn to play lacrosse in clinics and teams organized by the Summit Lacrosse Club. Many Division 1 lacrosse players have come from Summit High School or local private schools. In 2024, the Summit High School team was crowned the #1 team in New Jersey, beating arch-rival Westfield 7–5 in the Kirst Cup.

== Real estate and housing ==
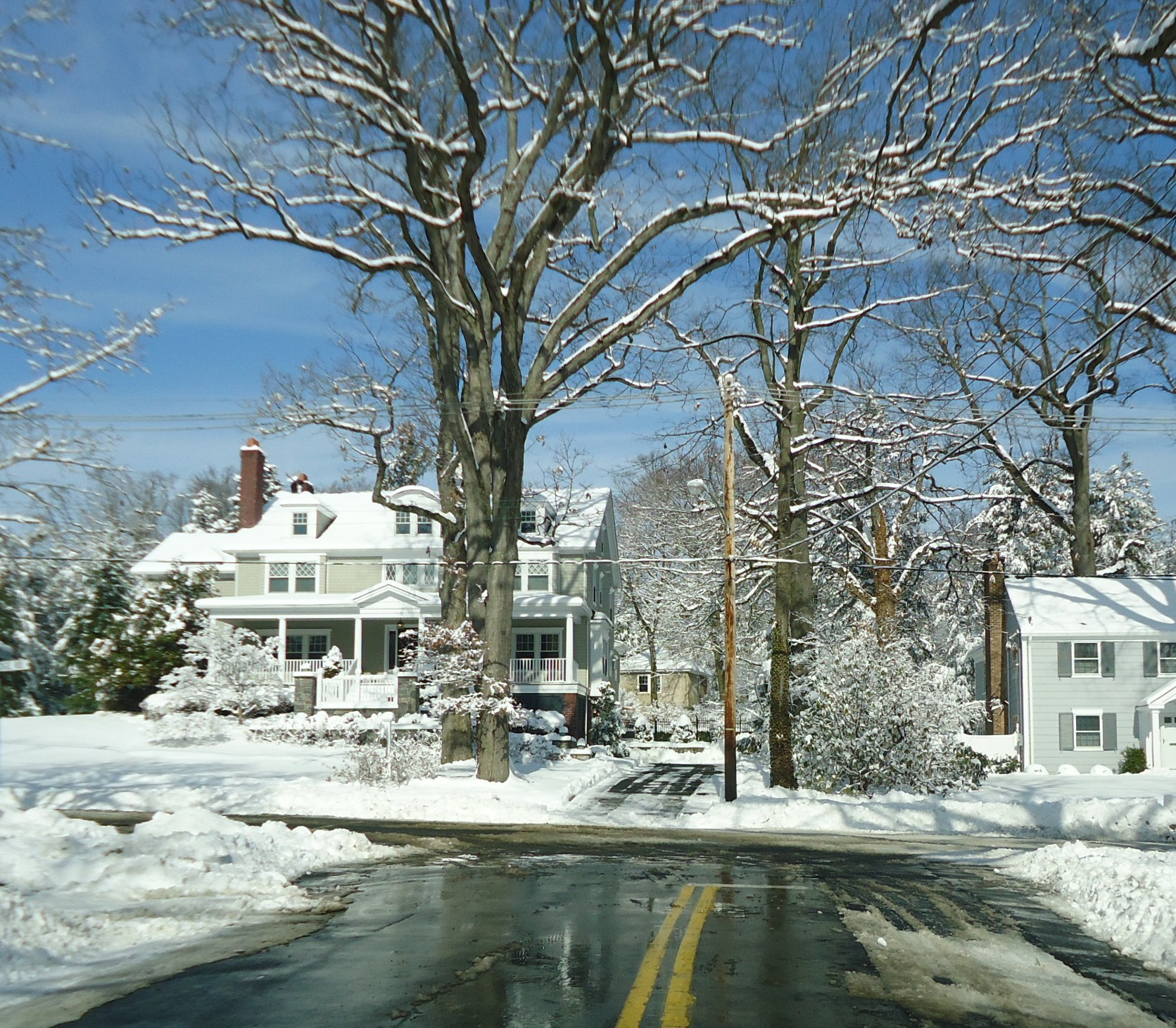
View of houses after a snowfall

Summit residential real estate is among the most expensive in the state. The 2018 median home price was $987,583. Real estate taxes vary; an $800,000 four-bedroom, 2-full-bath, 2-partial-bath single-family home built in 1939 had taxes of $16,000 in 2009. As of 2018, the average property tax bill in the city of Summit was $17,930, the 14th highest in the state.

Summit, along with many suburban communities in the United States, adopted a policy of zoning ordinances requiring a single-family house on a large lot and could thereby "exclude any undesirable influences that might erode property values", a requirement that effectively excluded apartment buildings and multi-family dwellings, and tended to raise the price of houses. One study found that since 1945, the single-family house on a large lot zoning mechanism "has been increasingly used in suburban and rural areas to safeguard particular vested interests." A reporter from The New York Times who is a Summit resident criticized the city for being an "economically, racially and ideologically homogenized populace" with "a growing divide between Summit's haves and have-nots." He elaborated in 2006: "there's an ever-diminishing corner of the city akin to the so-called slums of Beverly Hills, where middle-income homeowners like me can take advantage of the schools and services of Summit without the million-dollar price tags so ubiquitous on the other side of the Midtown Direct tracks." But he preferred the city as a place to raise and educate his children. One developer sued the city in 2005 to comply with New Jersey's Fair Housing Act to provide more affordable housing units. The city is working on a "housing master plan" to avoid future lawsuits from developers. In 2011, volunteers with Habitat for Humanity, in conjunction with church groups including St. Teresa of Avila and the Unitarian Church led by Vanessa Southern, constructed affordable housing on Morris Avenue.

Union County, which includes Summit, had the 10th highest property taxes in the nation as of 2010, based on data gathered by the National Taxpayers Union.

== Landmarks ==
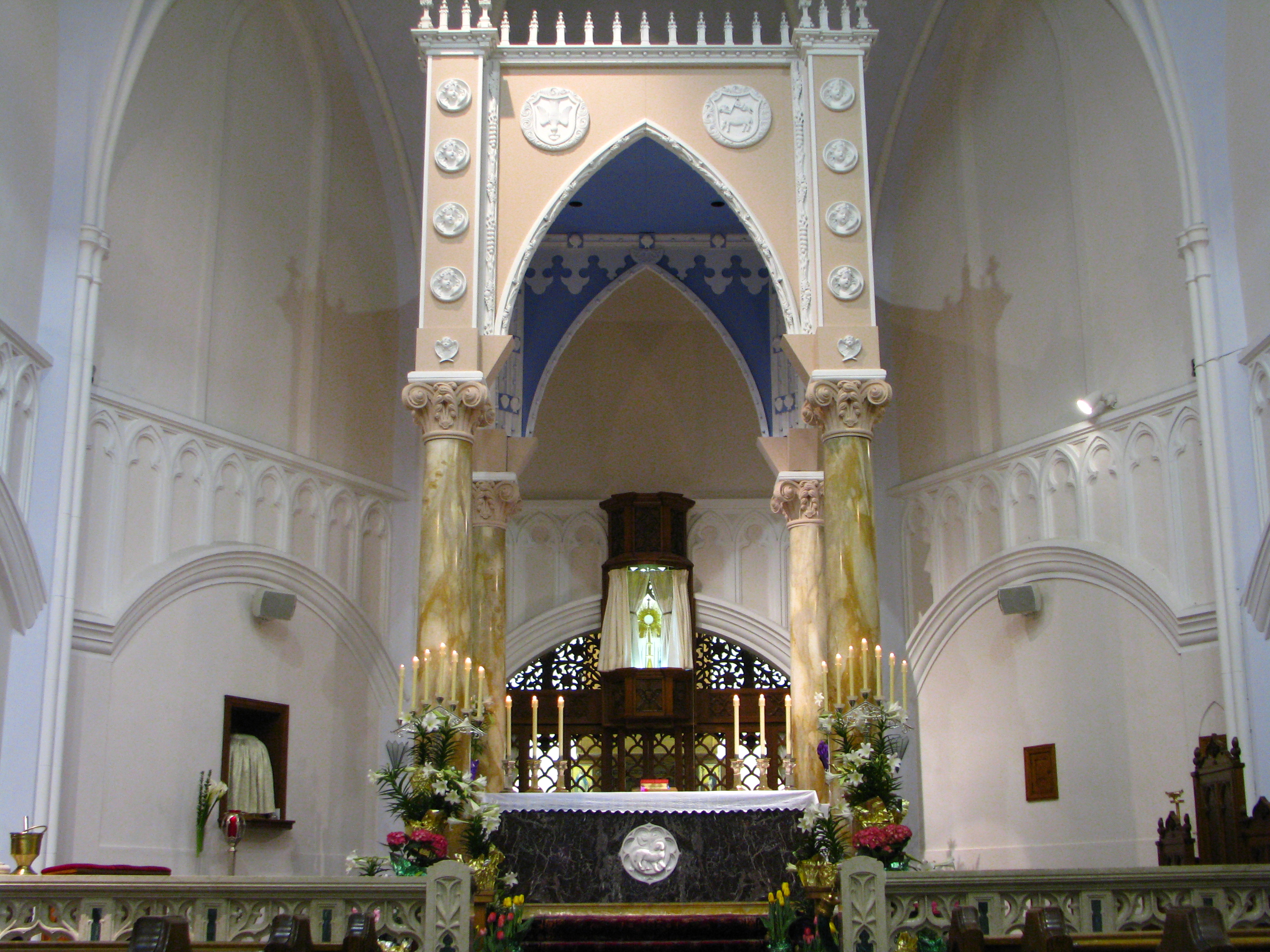
Chapel of the monastery of Dominican Nuns

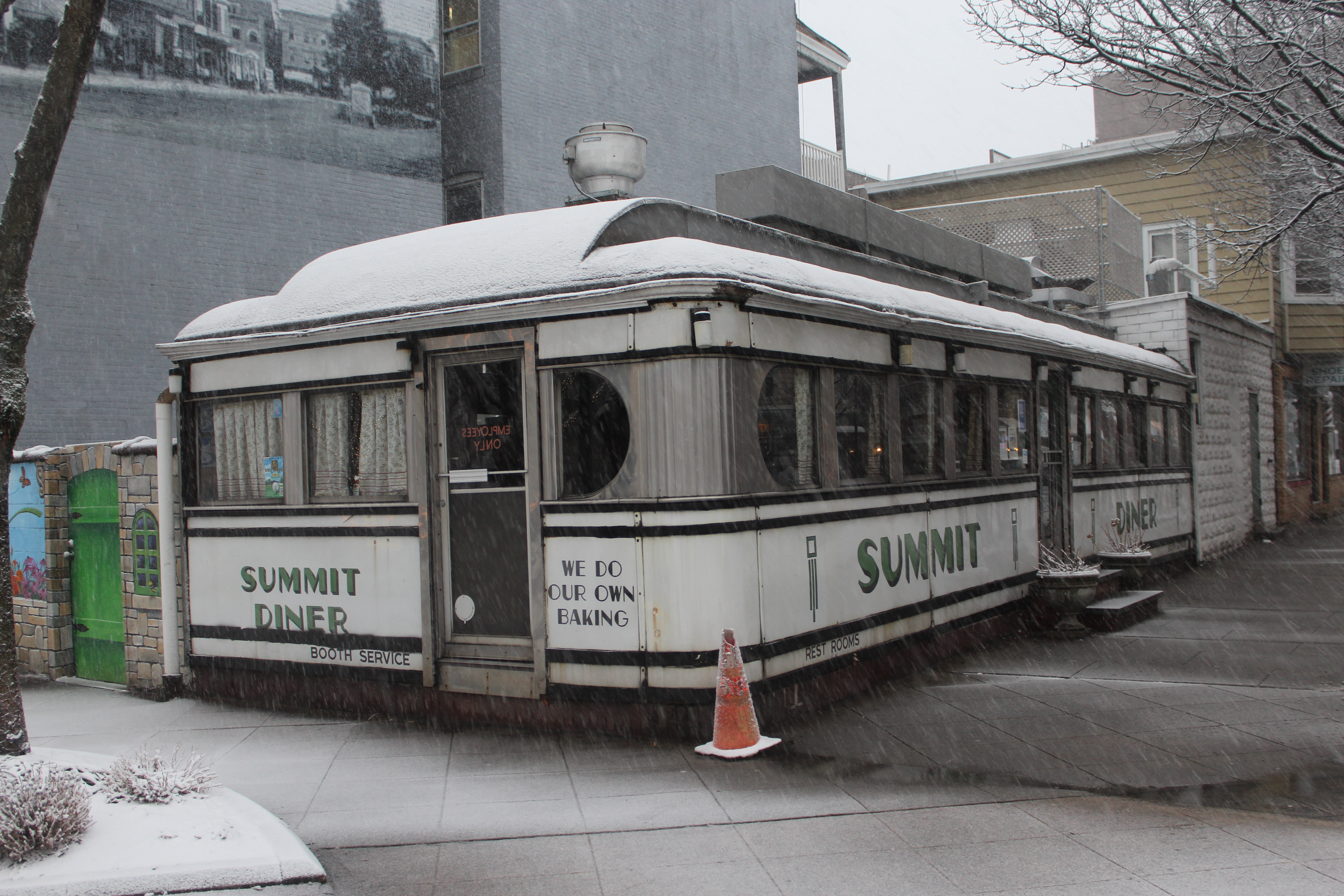
The Summit Diner at the corner of Summit Avenue and Union Place

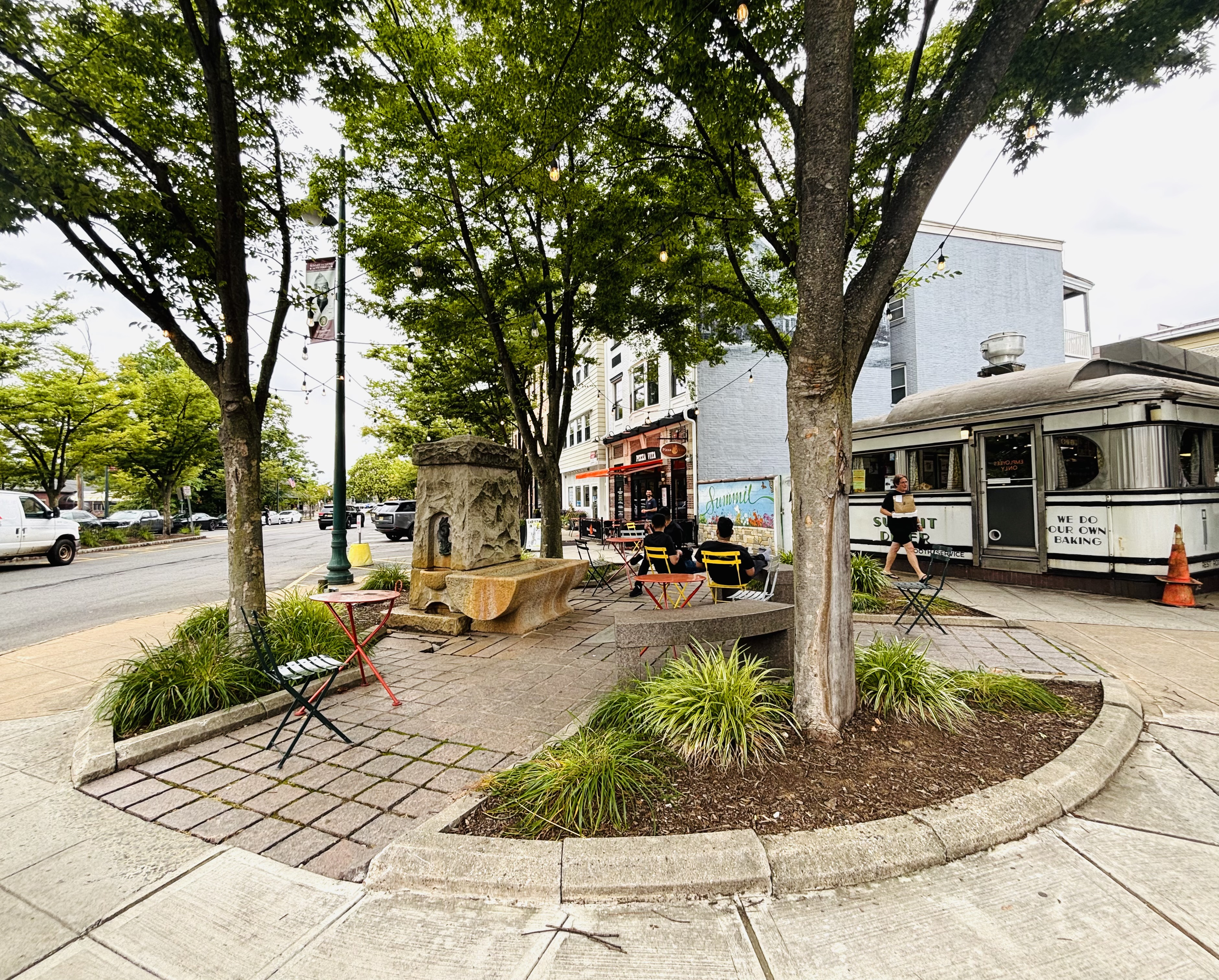
Horse trough (center left)

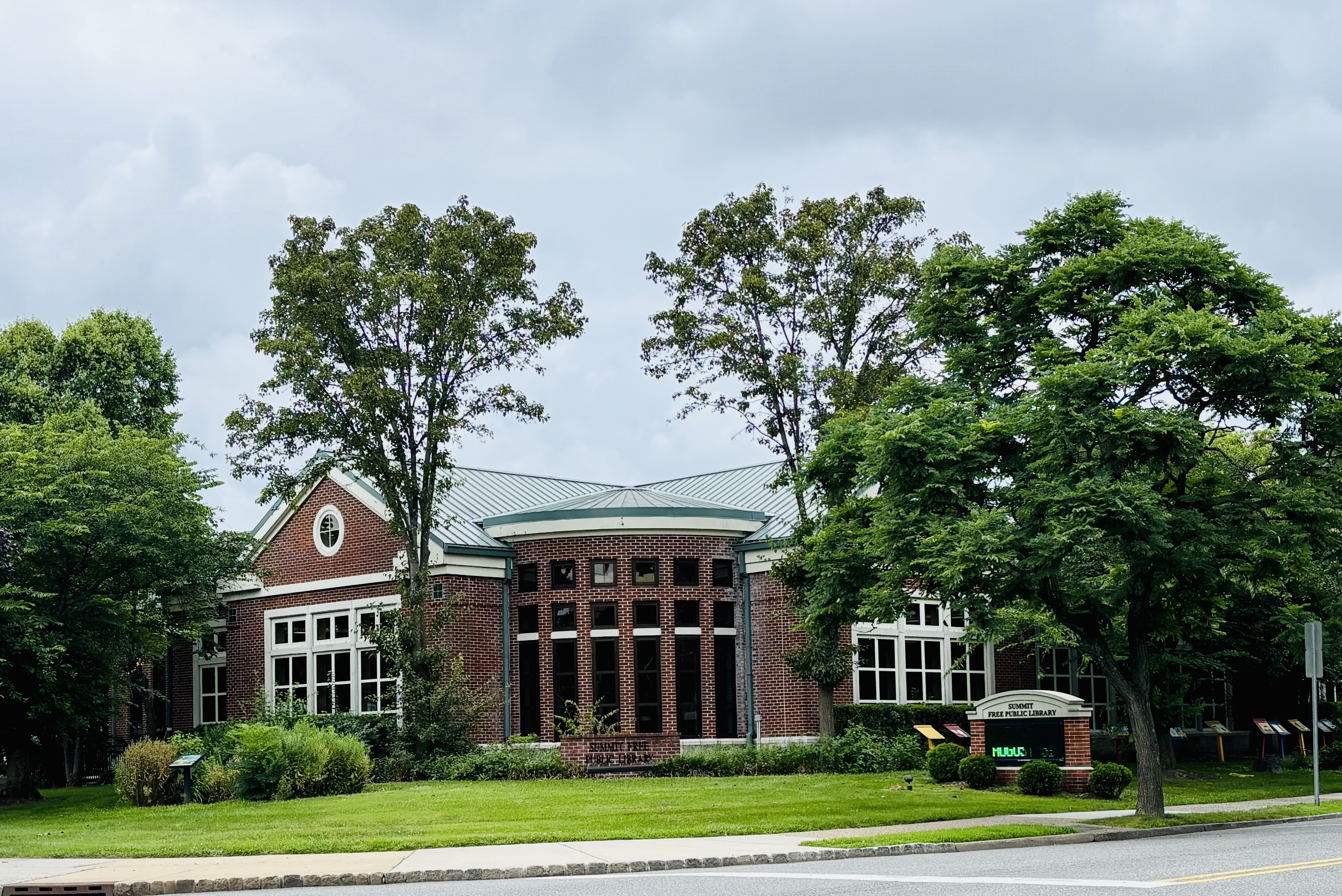
Summit Public Library from Maple St

- The Summit Downtown Historic District is on the United States Department of Interior National Register of Historic Places.
- The Carter House – at 90 Butler Parkway, Summit's oldest known structure, built in 1741, now home to the Summit Historical Society.
- The DeBary Inn was built in 1880 as one of the private residences of (Samuel) Frederick De Bary, a merchant of French wines, liquors, and other imported beverages. In 1916, the land was subdivided and sold, the house was moved 200 feet (61 m), and it opened as a hotel in 1923; later it housed senior citizens. Authorities and rules stymied an effort to turn it into a bed and breakfast in the early 2000s, and at present it serves as an "executive boutique inn" partially owned by CNBC host Jim Cramer.
- Vanderpoel Castle was a large residence built by George Vanderpoel in 1885. It was located on a 15-acre estate adjacent to Vanderpoel pond on what is now the Summit Municipal Golf Course, near the intersection of River Road, Route 24 and JFK Parkway. Later divided into apartments, it was demolished in 1969.
- The Grand Summit Hotel (formerly The Summit Suburban Hotel) hosts a variety of events, including stockholder meetings.
- The Kent Place School occupies a large block bordered by Kent Place Boulevard, Norwood Avenue, and Morris Avenue near downtown Summit. Its Mabie House was built in 1931.
- Dominican Monastery of Our Lady of the Rosary monastery is located on Springfield Avenue.
- The Summit Diner, located on the corner of Union Place & Summit Avenue, is a 1938 O'Mahony diner that has wood paneled walls, eight booths and 20 stools. It is said to be the oldest operating diner in the state.
- Summit Free Public Library offers a wide range of books, CDs, DVDs, internet access, special programs, and is located at the corner of Maple Street and Morris Avenue.
- Twin Maples is a registered Historic Place at Springfield Avenue and Edgewood Road. Constructed in 1908 based on a design by architect Alfred F. Norris, it is home to the Summit Fortnightly Club and the Junior Fortnightly.
- The United States Postal Service is on Maple Street near the downtown.

== Transportation ==
=== Roads and highways ===
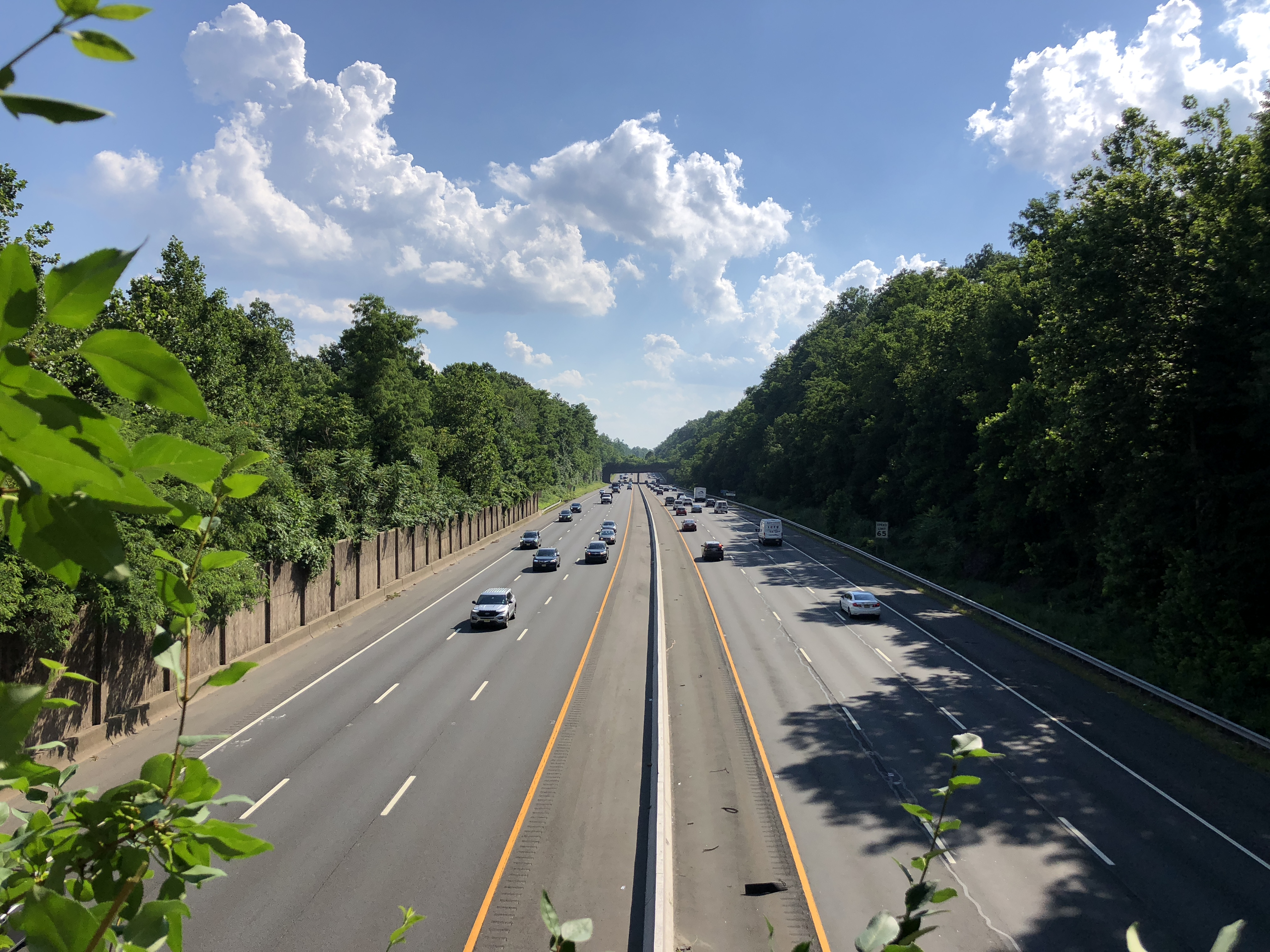
Interstate 78 in Summit

As of May 2010, the city had a total of 84.80 miles (136.47 km) of roadways, of which 66.94 miles (107.73 km) were maintained by the municipality, 14.72 miles (23.69 km) by Union County and 3.14 miles (5.05 km) by the New Jersey Department of Transportation.

Route 24 and Route 124 run along the eastern boundary of Summit, and Interstate 78 runs along the southern boundary. County Routes 512, 527 and 649 also pass through the city.

Parking is an ongoing issue. There are several free two-hour-limit parking lots for shoppers, as well as metered parking on main streets. The city council has conducted studies to explore further parking options.

=== Public transportation ===
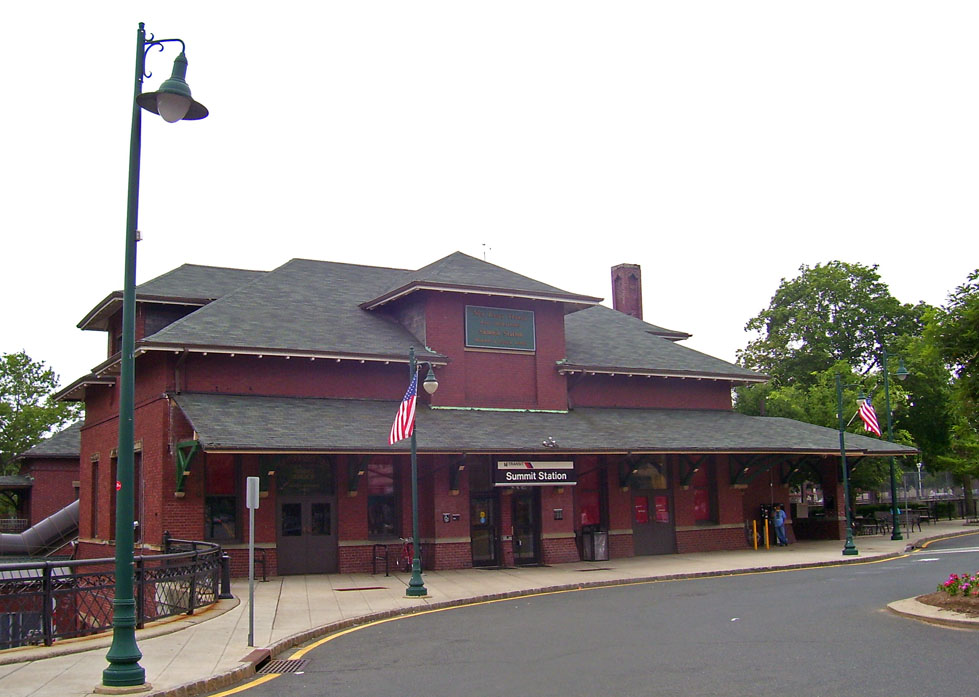
Summit Station

NJ Transit's Morristown Line and Gladstone Branch merge at Summit station, providing frequent passenger service to New York's Penn Station and Hoboken Terminal. The train ride from Summit to New York is about 50 minutes (local) or 35 minutes (express). One reporter wrote: "The train line dominates Summit, bisecting its handsome commercial district from the town green on a sunken track, like a Dutch canal."

NJ Transit offers bus service to and from Newark on the 70 route with local Wheels service on the 986 route.

Lakeland Bus Lines (Route 78) provides direct service to and from Manhattan during peak commuting hours.

Newark Liberty International Airport in Newark / Elizabeth is about 15 minutes away via Interstate 78.

== Media ==
Daily newspapers serving the community are The New York Times, The Wall Street Journal, and The Star-Ledger.

Locally, Summit is served by the Summit Herald-Dispatch and the Independent Press, the latter of which is based in New Providence and serves the City of Summit and several surrounding communities. Both newspapers are published on a weekly basis. Summit is also served by the online news source, The Alternative Press.

Summit is home to HTTV, a cable television station providing public, educational, and government access (PEG) cable TV programming. HTTV's signal reaches 32 municipalities in Union, Essex, Somerset and Morris counties via Verizon channel 33 and Comcast channel 36. The station produces original content weekly and provides live streaming from HTTVOnline.org.

== In popular culture ==
In "Mr. Monk and the End", the series finale of the cable TV show Monk, the fictional character of Randy Disher reveals he is leaving San Francisco because he has been offered the job as the chief of police of Summit, New Jersey. He is also going there to marry his longtime crush, Sharona Fleming. Following this up, in the 2012 novel Mr. Monk on Patrol, Randy has to bring Monk in after a corruption scandal sweeps the Summit government, leading to Randy becoming acting mayor.

The writing team for Monk was based in Summit.

== Notable people ==
People who were born in, residents of, or otherwise closely associated with Summit include:

- Ozzie Ahlers (born 1946), songwriter and music producer
- Robert Arellano (born 1969), author, musician and educator
- Miles Austin (born 1984), former NFL football player
- Stephen Austin, former NFL executive
- Michael Badgley (born 1995), current NFL football player
- Paul Baier (born 1985), professional ice hockey player
- Sean Baker (born 1971), Oscar-winning filmmaker.
- John Bardeen (1908–1991), winner of two (shared) Nobel prizes in physics
- Wendy Barker (born 1942), poet
- Anthony James Barr (born 1940), programming language designer, software engineer and inventor
- Jack Belden (1910–1989), war correspondent
- James M. Bennett (born 1948), FairTax advocate
- Mark Berson (born 1953), men's soccer coach at the University of South Carolina
- Robert Blackburn (1920–2003), artist and print maker
- Brett Ellen Block (born 1973), short story author and novelist
- Carson Block (born 1977), short-seller and investor
- Walter Houser Brattain (1902–1987), physicist who shared the 1956 Nobel Prize in Physics for the transistor
- Arthur Raymond Brooks (1895–1991), last surviving American flying ace of World War I
- Dave Brown (born 1970), quarterback who played for the New York Giants
- Fritz Buehning (born 1960), former professional tennis player
- Susannah Cahalan (born 1985), journalist and author
- Levin H. Campbell (born 1927), judge on the United States Court of Appeals for the First Circuit
- John Carroll (born 1955), former NBA basketball coach
- Mark Cesark (born 1965), sculptor
- Sarah Charlesworth (1947–2013), conceptual artist and photographer
- Greg Cohen (born 1953), jazz artist
- Laurie Collyer (born 1967), film director
- Anthony Comstock (1844–1915), legal reformer, famous for the anti-pornography laws named after him
- William A. Conway (1910–2006), banking executive and activist shareholder of behalf of minority stockholders
- Jon Corzine (born 1947), former U.S. senator from New Jersey and former governor of New Jersey
- Marguerite Courtot (1897–1986), silent film actress
- Jim Cramer (born 1955), stock trader and CNBC anchor and host
- Marshall Curry (born c. 1970), two-time Academy Award-nominated American documentary director, producer, cinematographer and editor
- J. Clydesdale Cushman (1887–1955), co-founder of the real estate firm Cushman & Wakefield
- Paul Davenport (born 1946), ninth president of the University of Western Ontario
- Vicky Dawson (born 1961), film and television actress
- Benjamin Henry Day Jr. (1838–1916), illustrator and printer
- (Samuel) Frederick De Bary (1815–1898), wealthy businessman who gave his name to Summit's DeBary Inn and to DeBary, Florida
- Leonard De Paur (1914–1998), composer
- Mark Di Ionno (born 1956), journalist and writer
- Lawrence Dillon (born 1959), composer in residence at the University of North Carolina School of the Arts
- Daniel Doan (1914–1993), author
- Mark Donohue (1937–1975), Indy, Formula 1 and NASCAR driver
- David Drake, chef
- East River Pipe musician Fred M. Cornog
- Frankie Edgar (born 1981), mixed martial artist
- Brian Edwards (born 1984), goalkeeper for Toronto FC
- Alan Louis Eggers (1895–1968), received the Medal of Honor for his actions during World War I
- Marianne Espinosa, Judge of the Appellate Division of New Jersey Superior Court
- Maggie Estep (1963–2014), writer and poet
- Kevin C. Fitzpatrick (born 1966), author
- Bob Franks (1951–2010), politician who served in the New Jersey General Assembly and represented New Jersey's 7th congressional district
- Kristine Froseth (born 1995), actress and model
- Doug Gansler (born 1962), attorney and politician who served as 45th Attorney General of Maryland
- Lauren Beth Gash (born 1960), lawyer and politician who served in the Illinois House of Representatives from 1993 to 2001
- Alex Gibney (born 1953), documentary film director and producer
- Charles Gibson (born 1943), former anchor of ABC News' World News Tonight and Good Morning America
- Dave Given (born 1954), former ice hockey right winger who played one game in the World Hockey Association for the Vancouver Blazers
- Scott Goldblatt (born 1979), freestyle swimmer who won a gold medal at the 2004 Summer Olympics
- Joseph Greenspan (born 1992), soccer player for the Pittsburgh Riverhounds SC of the United Soccer League
- Edna Guy (1907–1982), modern dance pioneer
- Alina Habba (born 1984), lawyer best known for representing former President of the United States, Donald Trump
- Norman Hill (born 1933), civil rights activist
- Constance Horner (born 1942), public official in the Reagan and first Bush administrations
- Frederick Erastus Humphreys (1883–1941), one of the first military pilots trained by the Wright brothers
- Ice-T (born 1958 as Tracy Lauren Marrow), rapper / actor who lived in Summit and attended Brayton Elementary School and Summit Junior High School (now Lawton C. Johnson Summit Middle School), both part of Summit Public Schools
- Charles R. Jackson (1903–1968), novelist best known for The Lost Weekend
- Nikki M. James (born 1981), actress and singer
- Violet A. Johnson (1870–1939), civic leader and founder of Fountain Baptist Church
- Reggie Jones (born 1951), retired boxer who represented the U.S. at the 1972 Summer Olympics, where he was controversially eliminated in a fight he was generally accepted to have won
- Judy Joo, chef, author, restaurateur and television personality
- Susan Kenney (born 1941), short story writer and novelist
- Lord Chancellor Kent (1763–1847), Lord Chancellor of New York State (1814–1823)
- Raymond Kethledge (born 1966), judge on the United States Court of Appeals for the Sixth Circuit
- Matthew Klapper, attorney who serves as Chief of Staff and Senior Counselor to the Attorney General at the United States Department of Justice
- Peter Kuhn (1955–2009), race car driver who won both the USAC and SCCA Formula Super Vee championships in 1980
- Peter Kuper (born 1958), alternative cartoonist and illustrator
- William "Bill" Larned (1872–1926), professional tennis player who won the US Open seven times from 1901 through 1911
- Al Leiter (born 1965), former MLB pitcher who played for both the New York Mets and New York Yankees
- Jack Leiter (born 2000), son of Al Leiter and second-overall pick in the 2021 MLB Draft
- MJ Long (1939–2018), architect, lecturer and author, best known for her work as a principal architect partner on the British Library in London, together with her husband
- William Lowell Sr. (1863–1954), dentist and an inventor of a wooden golf tee patented in 1921
- Hamilton Wright Mabie (1846–1916), author, lived in Summit
- Holbrook Mann MacNeille (1907–1973), mathematician who led military research teams before directing the American Mathematical Society
- Tim Mahoney (born 1956), former U.S. Representative from Florida's 16th congressional district
- Eli Manning (born 1981), former New York Giants quarterback
- Olivia Miles (born 2003), basketball player for the Minnesota Lynx
- Bryce Miller (born 1982), race car driver in the WeatherTech SportsCar Championship
- Richard McGee Morse (1922–2001), scholar of Latin American studies
- Dorthy Moxley (1932–2024), educator and crime victim advocate
- Eric Munoz (1947–2009), member of the New Jersey General Assembly who died in office
- Nancy Munoz (born 1954), member of the New Jersey General Assembly who took office following her husband's death
- Heidi Neumark (born 1954), pastor and spiritual writer
- Alexa Noel (born 2002), professional tennis player
- Ryan O'Malley (born 1993), tight end with the Oakland Raiders of the NFL
- Thomas E. O'Shea (1895–1918), United States Army corporal awarded the Medal of Honor posthumously for his actions during World War I
- Margareta Pâslaru (born 1943), Romanian singer
- Stephen Paulus (1949–2014), composer
- Hugo Pfaltz (1931–2019), politician who served two terms in the New Jersey General Assembly
- Christopher Porrino (born 1967), lawyer who became New Jersey Attorney General in 2016
- Jeff Porter (born 1985), track and field athlete who competes in the 110-meter hurdles and was named as part of the U.S. team at the 2016 Summer Olympics
- Joe Porter (born 1985), professional football player
- Monroe Jackson Rathbone II (1900–1976), chemical engineer and businessman who was the chairman, president, and CEO of Standard Oil of New Jersey
- Dennis Ritchie (1941–2011), creator of the C programming language and co-inventor of the UNIX operating system
- Florence Spearing Randolph (1866–1951), suffragist, ordained minister, pastor of the Wallace Chapel AME Zion Church
- Bill Robinson (born 1929), jazz singer
- David D. Rudolph (born 1949), member of the Maryland House of Delegates
- George Erik Rupp (born 1942), former President of Rice University and Columbia University, who has headed the International Rescue Committee since 2002
- Rex Ryan (born 1962), head coach of the Buffalo Bills
- Eli Sagan (1927–2015), clothing manufacturer, author, George McGovern campaign staffer, and member of Richard Nixon's Enemies List
- Robert F. Sargent (1923–2012), Coast Guard photographer, best known for his photo Into the Jaws of Death.
- C. Thomas Schettino (1907–1983), Associate Justice of the New Jersey Supreme Court from 1959 to 1972
- Craig Schiffer (born 1956), former chief executive officer of the Americas of Dresdner Kleinwort
- Herb Schmidt, soccer and lacrosse coach at Penn State University
- Pat Shurmur (born 1965), former head coach of the New York Giants
- James Sie (born 1962), voice actor
- Sadie Sink (born 2002), actress
- Gaddis Smith (1932–2022), historian at Yale University and an expert on U.S. foreign relations and maritime history
- Scott Smith (born 1965), author of the novel A Simple Plan and the script of the film of the same name
- Janet Sorg Stoltzfus (1931–2004), educator, who established the Ta'iz Cooperative School, the first non-religious school in North Yemen
- Joseph Stamler (1911–1988), New Jersey Superior Court judge and professor at Rutgers University
- Meryl Streep (born 1949), actress, winner of three Academy Awards, 21-time Oscar nominee
- Sándor Szabó (born 1960), pianist
- Will Taggart (born c. 1996), guitarist
- Tom Terrell (1950–2007), music journalist
- Henry Twombly (1862–1955), college football player and lawyer
- James Valenti (born 1977), operatic tenor
- Edwin S. Votey (1856–1931), businessman, inventor, industrial designer, and manufacturer of pianos and organs
- Arthur K. Watson (1919–1974), IBM executive and United States Ambassador to France
- Gerard Way (born 1977), singer-songwriter, who is co-founder of the band My Chemical Romance
- Kai Wehmeier (born 1968), logician and philosopher at the University of California, Irvine
- Meredith Whitney (born 1969), award-winning stock analyst who predicted the 2007–2008 banking crisis
- Worthington Whittredge (1820–1910), landscape artist and important member of the Hudson River School
- Robert R. Williams (1886–1965), chemist who was the first to synthesize thiamine
- Willie Wilson (born 1955), retired professional baseball player who won the American League batting title and who was a two-time All-Star for the Kansas City Royals
- Nick Wyman (born 1950), actor and president of Actors' Equity Association
- Adam Zucker (born 1976), sportscaster for CBS Sports and CBS Sports Network

== Points of interest ==
- Watchung Reservation, a nature reserve, borders Summit to the south.
- Downtown Summit has a variety of restaurants of different cuisines.
- Memorial Field features athletic fields, a play area for children, and tennis and basketball courts.
- Canoe Brook Country Club
- Beacon Hill Club
- New Jersey Visual Arts Center
- Summit Free Public Library
- Summit Family Aquatic Center
- Summit Community Center
- Summit Area YMCA

== Non-profit and charitable organizations ==
- Other Fellow First Foundation. Headquartered at the Summit Diner since its founding in 2000, the Other Fellow First Foundation uses its small endowment to quickly aid New Jersey families in distress. It has raised and given away more than $6,000,000 to people and local non-profit organizations. They run a yearly "Frozen Turkey Drive" and have raised money for SAGE Eldercare's Meals on Wheels program, the Summit Volunteer First Aid Squad's new building, and other causes.
- GRACE. Founded in 2016 by the Junior League of Summit with The Connection and The United Way, GRACE (Giving and Receiving Assistance for our Community's Essentials) give food and basic necessities to local families in need. Until 2020, the all-volunteer program supported the weekly needs of about 100 local families; the pandemic pushed that number to more than 500. In 2020, GRACE achieved 501c(3) status and became a part of the city's Department of Community Programs. GRACE is headquartered at Cornog Field House at Soldier's Memorial Field in Summit.
- Bridges Outreach. Founded in 1988, Bridges Outreach in 2020 delivered 65,000 brown bag meals, 10,000 pairs of underwear and socks, 7,500 toiletry kits, 49,000 cups of soup, and other clothing to more than 21,000 people in New York City, Newark, Irvington, and Summit.
- SHIP (Summit Helping Its People). Founded in 1990 by the Summit Interfaith Clergy Fellowship and supported solely by donations, SHIP serves more than 15,000 lunch and dinner meals each year to homeless and at-risk homeless people not served by other local programs.
- Summit Marches On. Founded in 2017 to advocate for progressive causes, voter education/engagement, and to organize local events and initiatives to support the community. Their charitable initiatives include: SHIELD of Summit, which matches senior citizens and the infirm with volunteer grocery shoppers; the Fabric Mask Assembly line; the Summit Volunteer Hub on Facebook, which matches charities and volunteers; and collaborations with a variety of local organizations on fundraising and good-raising initiatives.
- Empowering Kids Organization. Founded in 2019, the group works to help underprivileged kids by connecting their families with opportunities and resources, such as tutoring, camps, and art and improv classes.
- Family Promise. Founded in 1986 as a local charity, the organization now has affiliates nationwide. It works to help homeless and low-income families achieve independence through community efforts.
