= Berkeley Heights, New Jersey =

Township in Union County, New Jersey, US

- Township
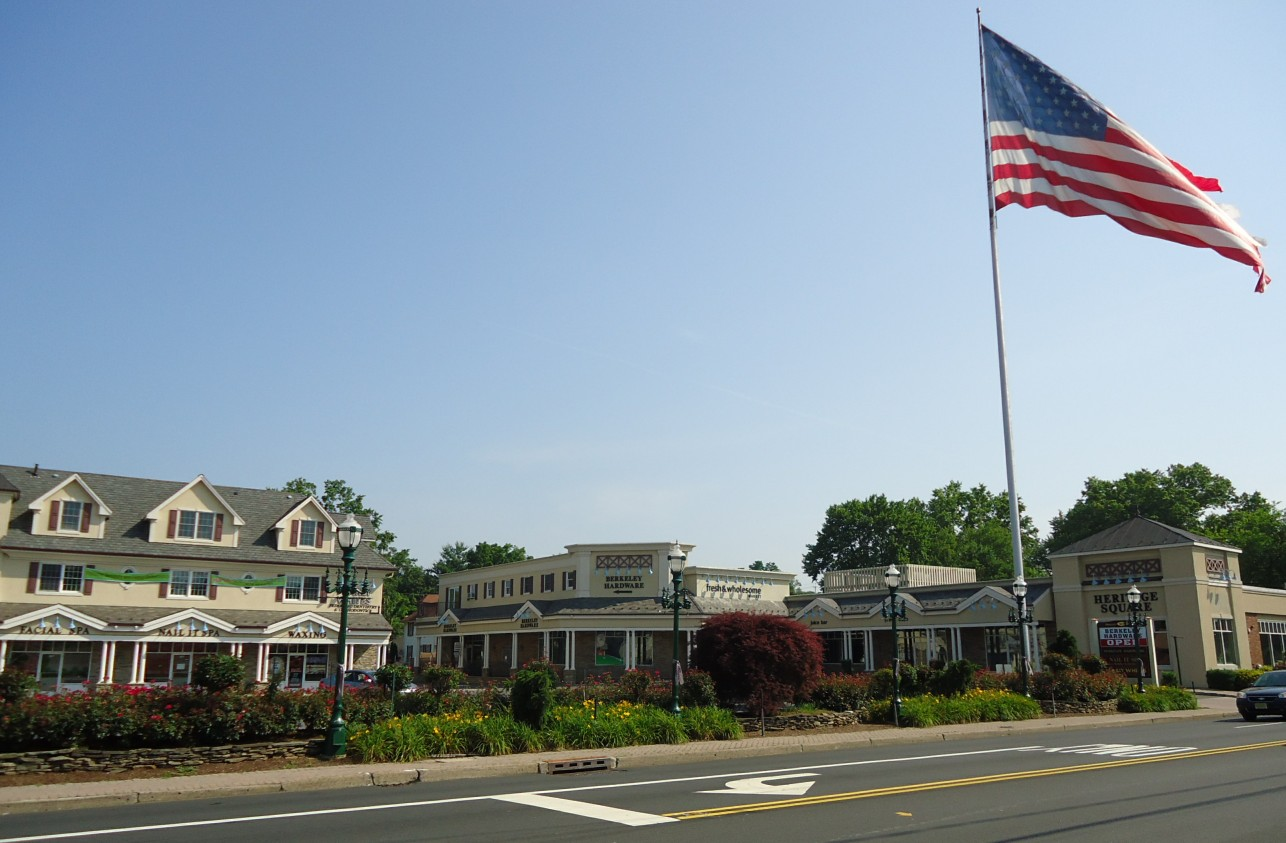
- Heritage Square Shopping Center

- Flag Seal
- Motto: "Where Tradition Meets Tomorrow."
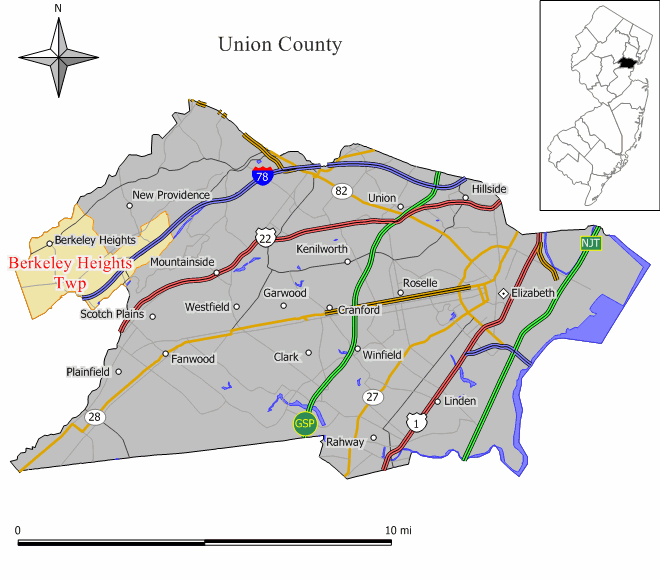
- Location of Berkeley Heights in Union County highlighted in yellow (left). Inset map: Location of Union County in New Jersey highlighted in black (right).

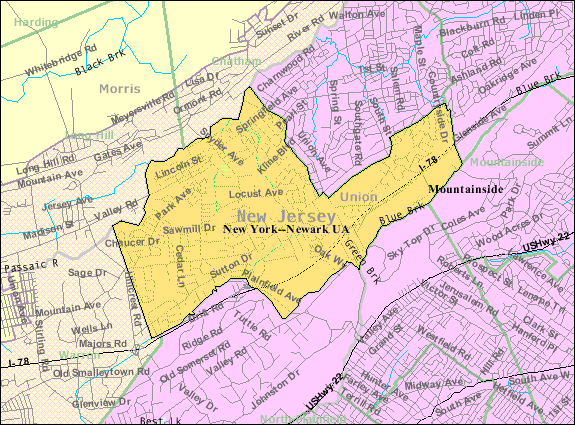
- Census Bureau map of Berkeley Heights, New Jersey

- Location in Union County Location in New Jersey Location in the United States
- Coordinates: 40.676119°N 74.422756°W
- Country: United States
- State: New Jersey
- County: Union
- Incorporated: November 8, 1809 (as New Providence Township)
- Renamed: November 6, 1951 (as Berkeley Heights Township)
- Named for: John Berkeley, 1st Baron Berkeley of Stratton

Government
  - Type: Faulkner Act (mayor–council–administrator)
  - Body: Township Council
  - Mayor: Angie Devanney (D, term ends December 31, 2026)
  - Administrator: Liza Viana
  - Municipal clerk: Angela Lazzari

Area
  - Total: 6.26 sq mi (16.21 km^{2})
  - Land: 6.22 sq mi (16.11 km^{2})
  - Water: 0.039 sq mi (0.10 km^{2}) 0.59%
  - Rank: 251st of 565 in state 6th of 21 in county
- Elevation: 394 ft (120 m)

Population (2020)
  - Total: 13,285
  - Estimate (2024): 14,510
  - Rank: 194th of 565 in state 16th of 21 in county
  - Density: 2,135.9/sq mi (824.7/km^{2})
  - Rank: 284th of 565 in state 20th of 21 in county
- Time zone: UTC−05:00 (Eastern (EST))
  - Summer (DST): UTC−04:00 (Eastern (EDT))
- ZIP Code: 07922
- Area code: 908
- FIPS code: 3403905320
- GNIS feature ID: 0882218
- Website: www.berkeleyheights.gov

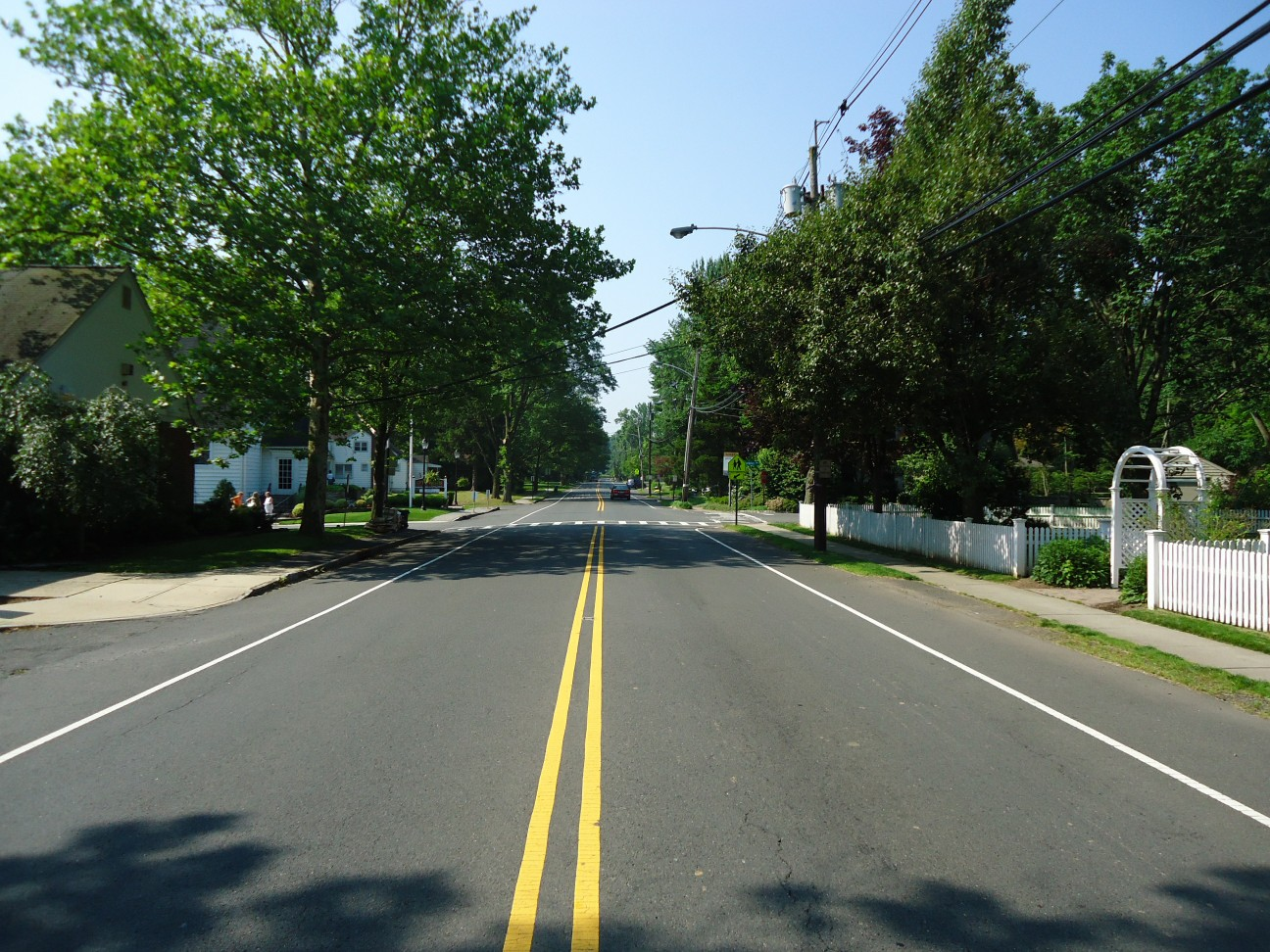
Plainfield Avenue

Berkeley Heights is a township in Union County, New Jersey, United States, on a ridge in north central New Jersey, Berkeley Heights is a commuter town of New York City, in the Raritan Valley region and also bordering both Morris and Somerset counties in the Passaic Valley region. As of the 2020 United States census the township's population was 13,285, an increase of 102 (+0.8%) from the 2010 census count of 13,183, which in turn reflected a decline of 224 (−1.7%) from the 13,407 counted in the 2000 census.

The township was originally incorporated as New Providence Township by the New Jersey Legislature on November 8, 1809, from portions of Springfield Township, while the area was still part of Essex County. New Providence Township became part of the newly formed Union County at its creation on March 19, 1857. Portions of the township were taken on March 23, 1869, to create Summit, and on March 14, 1899, to form the borough of New Providence. On November 6, 1951, the name of the township was changed to Berkeley Heights, based on the results of a referendum held that day. The township was named for John Berkeley, 1st Baron Berkeley of Stratton, one of the founders of the Province of New Jersey.

The township has been ranked as one of the state's highest-income communities. Based on data from the American Community Survey for 2013–2017, township residents had a median household income of $147,614, ranked 15th in the state among municipalities with more than 10,000 residents, almost double the statewide median of $76,475.

The township was listed as the fifth safest place in New Jersey as well as the ninth safest municipality in the nation according to a 2022 crime statistic compilation from Safewise.com.

== History ==
The Lenape Native Americans were known to inhabit the region, including the area now known as Berkeley Heights, dating back to the 1524 voyage of Giovanni da Verrazzano to what is now Lower New York Bay.

The earliest construction in Berkeley Heights began in an area that is now part of the 1,960 acres (7.9 km^{2}) Watchung Reservation, a Union County park that includes 305 acres (1.23 km^{2}) of the township.

The first European settler was Peter Willcox, who received a 424 acres (1.72 km^{2}) land grant in 1720 from the Elizabethtown Associates. This group bought much of northern New Jersey from the Lenape in the late 17th century. Willcox built a grist and lumber mill across Green Brook.

In 1793, a regional government was formed. It encompassed the area from present-day Springfield Township, Summit, New Providence, and Berkeley Heights, and was called Springfield Township. Growth continued in the area, and by 1809, Springfield Township divided into Springfield Township and New Providence Township, which included present day Summit, New Providence, and Berkeley Heights.

In 1845, Willcox's heirs sold the mill to David Felt, a paper manufacturer from New York. Felt built a small village around the mill aptly named Feltville. It included homes for workers and their families, dormitories, orchards, a post office and a general store with a second floor church.

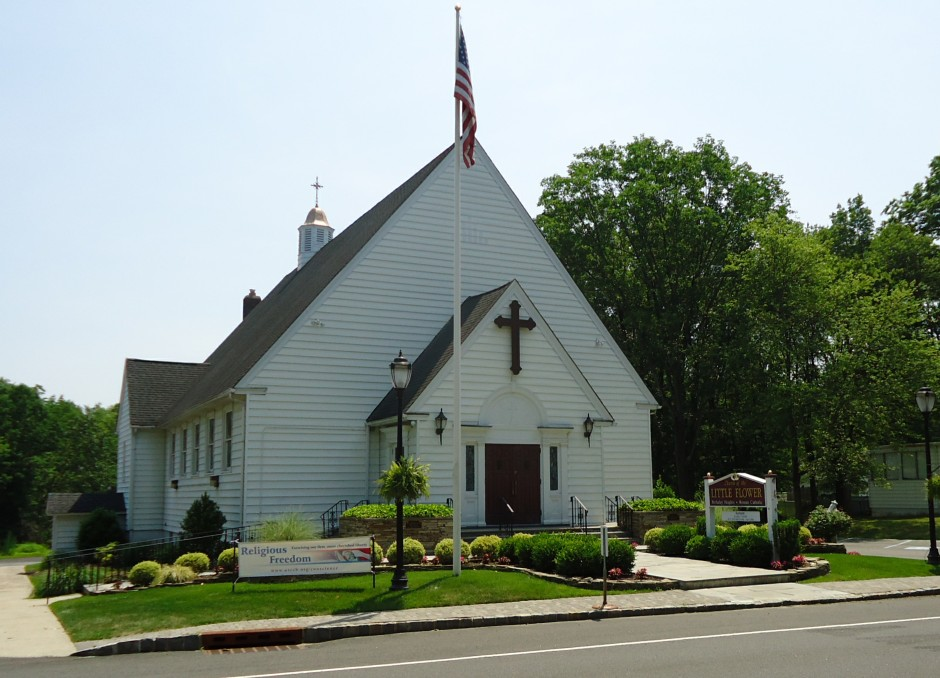
Little Flower Catholic Church

In 1860, Feltville was sold to sarsaparilla makers. Other manufacturing operations continued until Feltville went into bankruptcy in 1882. When residents moved away, the area became known as Deserted Village. Village remains consist of seven houses, a store, the mill and a barn. Deserted Village is listed on the National Register of Historic Places and is undergoing restoration by the Union County Parks Department. Restoration grants of almost $2 million were received from various state agencies. Deserted Village, in the Watchung Reservation, is open daily for unguided walking tours during daylight hours.

On March 23, 1869, Summit Township (now the City of Summit) seceded from New Providence Township. On March 14, 1899, the Borough of New Providence seceded from New Providence Township. Present day Berkeley Heights remained as New Providence Township. Many of the townships and regional areas in New Jersey were separating into small, locally governed communities at that time due to acts of the New Jersey Legislature that made it economically advantageous for the communities to do so.

Due to confusion between the adjacent municipalities of the Borough of New Providence and the Township of New Providence, the township conducted a referendum in 1952 and voted to change the name to Berkeley Heights Township. The origin of the township's name has never been fully established, but is believed to have been taken from an area of town that was referred to by this moniker, which itself was assumed to be derived from Lord John Berkeley, who was co-proprietor of New Jersey from 1664 to 1674.

Early life in Berkeley Heights is documented in the Littell-Lord Farmhouse Museum & Farmstead (31 Horseshoe Road in Berkeley Heights), an 18-acre (73,000 m^{2}) museum surrounding two houses, one of which was built c. 1760 and the other near the start of the 19th century. Among the exhibits are a Victorian master bedroom and a Victorian children's room, furnished with period antiques. The children's room also has reproductions of antique toys, which visitors can play with. The museum, which is on the National Register of Historic Places, also includes an outbuilding that was used as a summer kitchen, a corn crib dating to the 19th century and a spring house built around a spring and used for refrigeration. The museum is open 2–4 p.m. on the third Sunday of each month from April through December, or by appointment.

The township owes its rural character to its late development. Until 1941, when the American Telephone and Telegraph Company built the AT&T Bell Laboratories research facility in the township, it was a sleepy farming and resort community.

Berkeley Heights is host to a traditional religious procession and feast carried out by members of Our Lady of Mt. Carmel Society. The feast is capped by one of the largest fireworks shows in the state. The Feast of Mt. Carmel has been a town tradition since 1909.

In 1958, part of a Nike missile battery (NY-73) was installed in Berkeley Heights. The missiles were located in nearby Mountainside, while the radar station was installed in Berkeley Heights. It remained in operation until 1963, and remnants of the site are located adjacent to Governor Livingston High School.

In 1960, the town’s seal was created via a contest in which local students could enter a design, and the best of these was officially named the seal, through an announcement on June 17, at Columbia Middle School. Patricia Jean Taylor created the winning design, which was chosen from a pool of 150 entries.

=== Free Acres ===
Another early Berkeley Heights community of note is the 67-acre (270,000 m^{2}) Free Acres, established in 1910 by Bolton Hall, a New York entrepreneur and reformer who believed in the idea of Henry George, the economist, of single taxation, under which residents pay tax to the community, which, in turn, pays a lump sum to the municipality. Among the early residents of Free Acres were the actor James Cagney and his wife, Billie.

Residents of Free Acres pay tax to their association, which maintains its streets and swimming pool, approves architectural changes to homes and pays a lump sum in taxes to the municipality.

== Geography ==
According to the United States Census Bureau, the township had a total area of 6.26 square miles (16.21 km^{2}), including 6.22 square miles (16.11 km^{2}) of land and 0.04 square miles (0.10 km^{2}) of water (0.59%). Certain portions of Berkeley Heights are located in various flood zones.

The township is located partially on the crest of the Second Watchung Mountain and in the Passaic River Valley, aptly named as the Passaic River forms the township's northern border. The township is also located partially in the Raritan Valley region, in which the Green Brook (a tributary of the Raritan River) forms the township's eastern border near the Watchung Reservation. Berkeley Heights is located in northwestern Union County, at the confluence of Union, Morris, and Somerset Counties. Berkeley Heights is bordered by New Providence, Mountainside and Summit to the east, Scotch Plains to the southeast, Chatham to the north, Watchung to the south, and Warren Township and Long Hill Township to the west.

Unincorporated communities, localities and place names located partially or completely within the township include Benders Corners, Glenside Park, Stony Hill and Union Village.

=== Downtown ===
Downtown Berkeley Heights is located along Springfield Avenue, approximately between the intersections with Plainfield Avenue and Snyder Avenue. Downtown is home to more than 20 restaurants which join with the Downtown Beautification Committee to hold an annual Restaurant Week each September. In addition, a post office, the Municipal Building, police station, train station, and other shops and services are located in this downtown section.

A brick walk with personalized bricks engraved with the names of many long-time Berkeley Heights residents runs from near the railroad station towards the planned Stratton House development, at the site of the former Kings. A memorial to the victims of the September 11 terrorist attacks adjoins a wooded area alongside Park Avenue, just southwest of downtown.

Certain portions of Berkeley Heights are located in flood zones. Residential homes, as well as some commercial areas along the downtown Springfield Avenue area, are impacted by flooding.

== Demographics ==
Historical population
Census	Pop.	Note	%±
1810	756		—
1820	768		1.6%
1830	903		17.6%
1840	832		−7.9%
1850	1,216		46.2%
1860	1,308		7.6%
1870	934	*	−28.6%
1880	781		−16.4%
1890	839		7.4%
1900	469	*	−44.1%
1910	526		12.2%
1920	954		81.4%
1930	1,899		99.1%
1940	2,194		15.5%
1950	3,466		58.0%
1960	8,721		151.6%
1970	13,078		50.0%
1980	12,549		−4.0%
1990	11,980		−4.5%
2000	13,407		11.9%
2010	13,183		−1.7%
2020	13,285		0.8%
2024 (est.)	14,510		9.2%
Population sources:1810–1920 1840 1850 1860–1870; 1870 1880–1890; 1890–1910 1910–1930; 1940–2000 2000; 2010 2020 * = Lost territory in previous decade.

=== 2020 census ===
The 2020 United States census counted 13,285 people, and 3,718 families in the township. The population density was 2,135.8 per square mile. There were 4,660 households (4,484 of which were occupied).

Berkeley Heights township, Union County, New Jersey – Racial and ethnic composition Note: the US Census treats Hispanic/Latino as an ethnic category. This table excludes Latinos from the racial categories and assigns them to a separate category. Hispanics/Latinos may be of any race.
Race / Ethnicity (NH = Non-Hispanic)	Pop 2000	Pop 2010	Pop 2020	% 2000	% 2010	% 2020
White alone (NH)	11,611	10,760	9,278	86.60%	81.62%	69.84%
Black or African American alone (NH)	143	186	242	1.07%	1.41%	1.82%
Native American or Alaska Native alone (NH)	10	3	5	0.07%	0.02%	0.04%
Asian alone (NH)	1,055	1,372	2,065	7.87%	10.41%	15.54%
Native Hawaiian or Pacific Islander alone (NH)	0	0	1	0.00%	0.00%	0.01%
Other race alone (NH)	18	14	84	0.13%	0.11%	0.63%
Mixed race or Multiracial (NH)	76	173	470	0.57%	1.31%	3.54%
Hispanic or Latino (any race)	494	675	1,140	3.86%	5.12%	8.58%
Total	13,407	13,183	13,285	100.00%	100.00%	100.00%

=== 2010 census ===
The 2010 United States census counted 13,183 people, 4,470 households, and 3,580 families in the township. The population density was 2,122.4 per square mile (819.5/km^{2}). There were 4,596 housing units at an average density of 739.9 per square mile (285.7/km^{2}). The racial makeup was 85.64% (11,290) White, 1.49% (197) Black or African American, 0.02% (3) Native American, 10.43% (1,375) Asian, 0.00% (0) Pacific Islander, 0.75% (99) from other races, and 1.66% (219) from two or more races. Hispanic or Latino of any race were 5.12% (675) of the population.

Of the 4,470 households, 41.7% had children under the age of 18; 71.1% were married couples living together; 6.5% had a female householder with no husband present and 19.9% were non-families. Of all households, 17.6% were made up of individuals and 10.4% had someone living alone who was 65 years of age or older. The average household size was 2.85 and the average family size was 3.26.

26.9% of the population were under the age of 18, 5.2% from 18 to 24, 20.5% from 25 to 44, 30.0% from 45 to 64, and 17.5% who were 65 years of age or older. The median age was 43.5 years. For every 100 females, the population had 90.6 males. For every 100 females ages 18 and older there were 87.5 males.

The Census Bureau's 2006–2010 American Community Survey showed that (in 2010 inflation-adjusted dollars) median household income was $132,089 (with a margin of error of +/− $11,331) and the median family income was $150,105 (+/− $17,689). Males had a median income of $105,733 (+/− $10,158) versus $55,545 (+/− $11,985) for females. The per capita income for the township was $56,737 (+/− $5,135). About 0.8% of families and 1.4% of the population were below the poverty line, including 1.7% of those under age 18 and 0.7% of those age 65 or over.

=== 2000 census ===
As of the 2000 United States census there were 13,407 people, 4,479 households, and 3,717 families residing in the township. The population density was 2,140.7 inhabitants per square mile (826.5/km^{2}). There were 4,562 housing units at an average density of 728.4 per square mile (281.2/km^{2}). The racial makeup of the township was 89.65% White, 1.11% African American, 0.08% Native American, 7.87% Asian, 0.61% from other races, and 0.68% from two or more races. Hispanic or Latino of any race were 3.68% of the population.

There were 4,479 households, out of which 41.5% had children under the age of 18 living with them, 74.1% were married couples living together, 6.9% had a female householder with no husband present, and 17.0% were non-families. 14.8% of all households were made up of individuals, and 7.5% had someone living alone who was 65 years of age or older. The average household size was 2.89 and the average family size was 3.21.

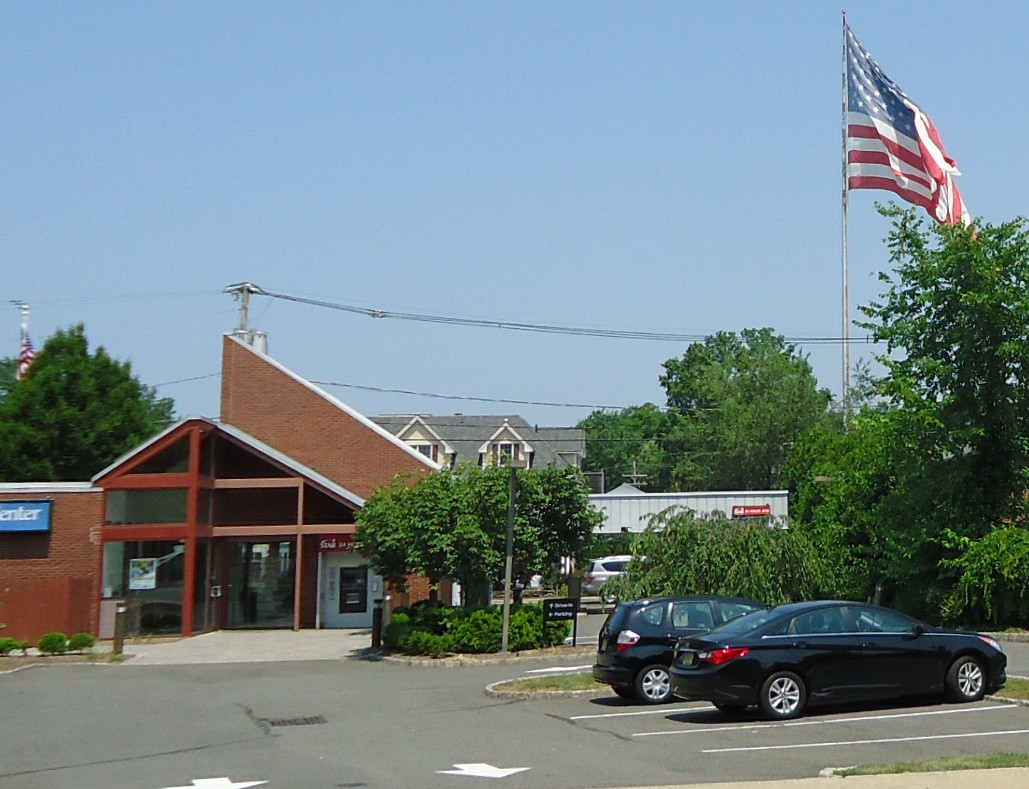
A giant flag flies over the intersection of Plainfield and Springfield avenues

In the township the population was spread out, with 26.8% under the age of 18, 4.2% from 18 to 24, 27.8% from 25 to 44, 24.8% from 45 to 64, and 16.4% who were 65 years of age or older. The median age was 40 years. For every 100 females, there were 91.0 males. For every 100 females age 18 and over, there were 87.4 males.

The median income for a household in the township was $107,716, and the median income for a family was $118,862. Males had a median income of $83,175 versus $50,022 for females. The per capita income for the township was $43,981. About 1.5% of families and 2.1% of the population were below the poverty line, including 1.8% of those under age 18 and 3.1% of those age 65 or over.

== Economy ==
Berkeley Heights is home to the Murray Hill Bell Labs headquarters of Nokia. The transistor, solar cell, laser, and AT&T Unix (precursor to Unix) were invented in this facility when it was part of AT&T.

Berkeley Heights is also home to L'Oréal USA's New Jersey headquarters.

In 2003, Summit Medical Group signed a lease to build its main campus on the site of the former D&B Corporation headquarters located on Diamond Hill Road. Summit Medical Group merged with CityMD in 2019 to form Summit Health, which has 2,500 health care providers in the New York City area and Oregon.

== Arts and culture ==
Musical groups from Berkeley Heights include the alternative rock band, BEDlight for BlueEYES.

== Parks and recreation ==
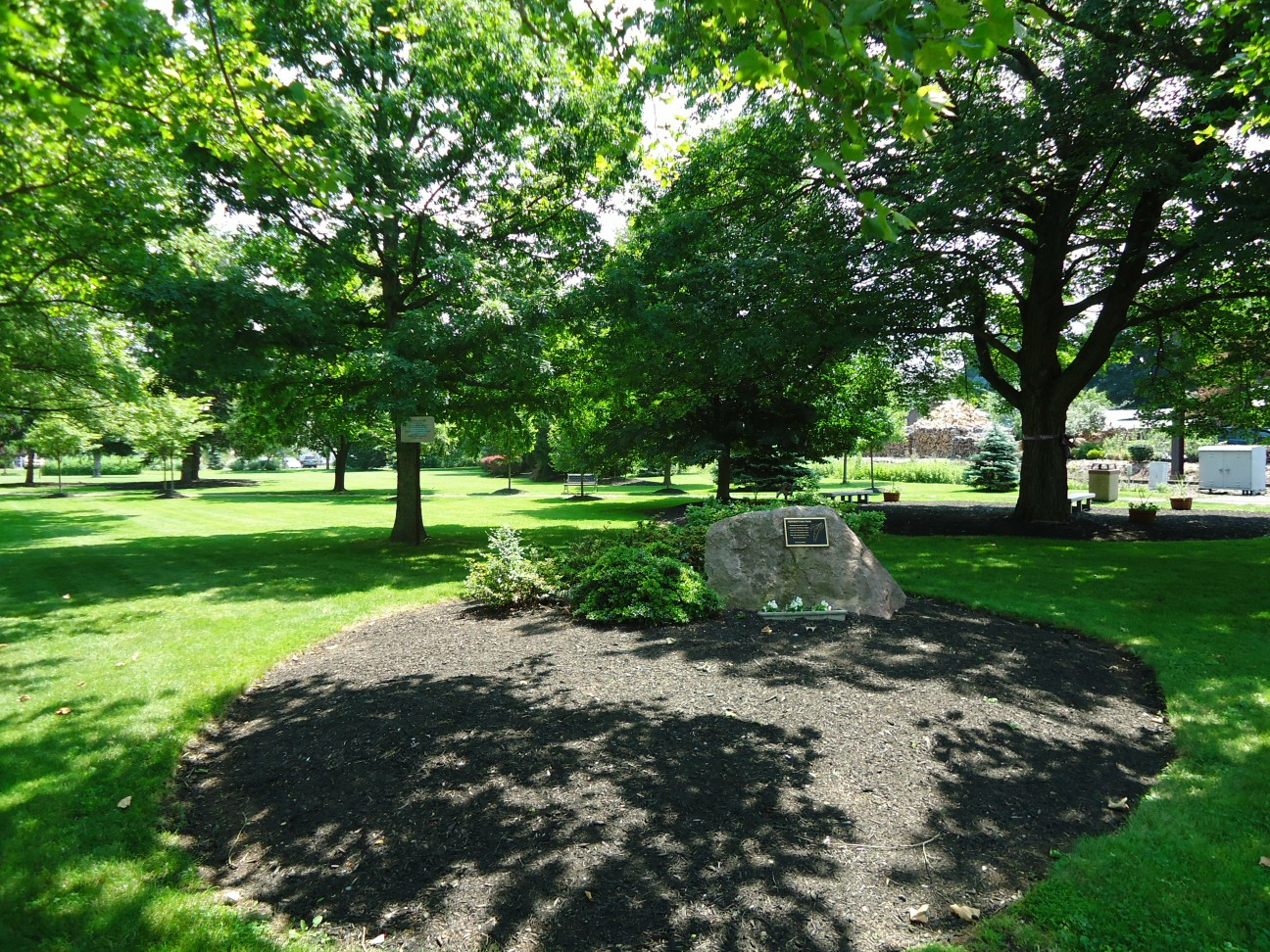
Peppertown park near the train station

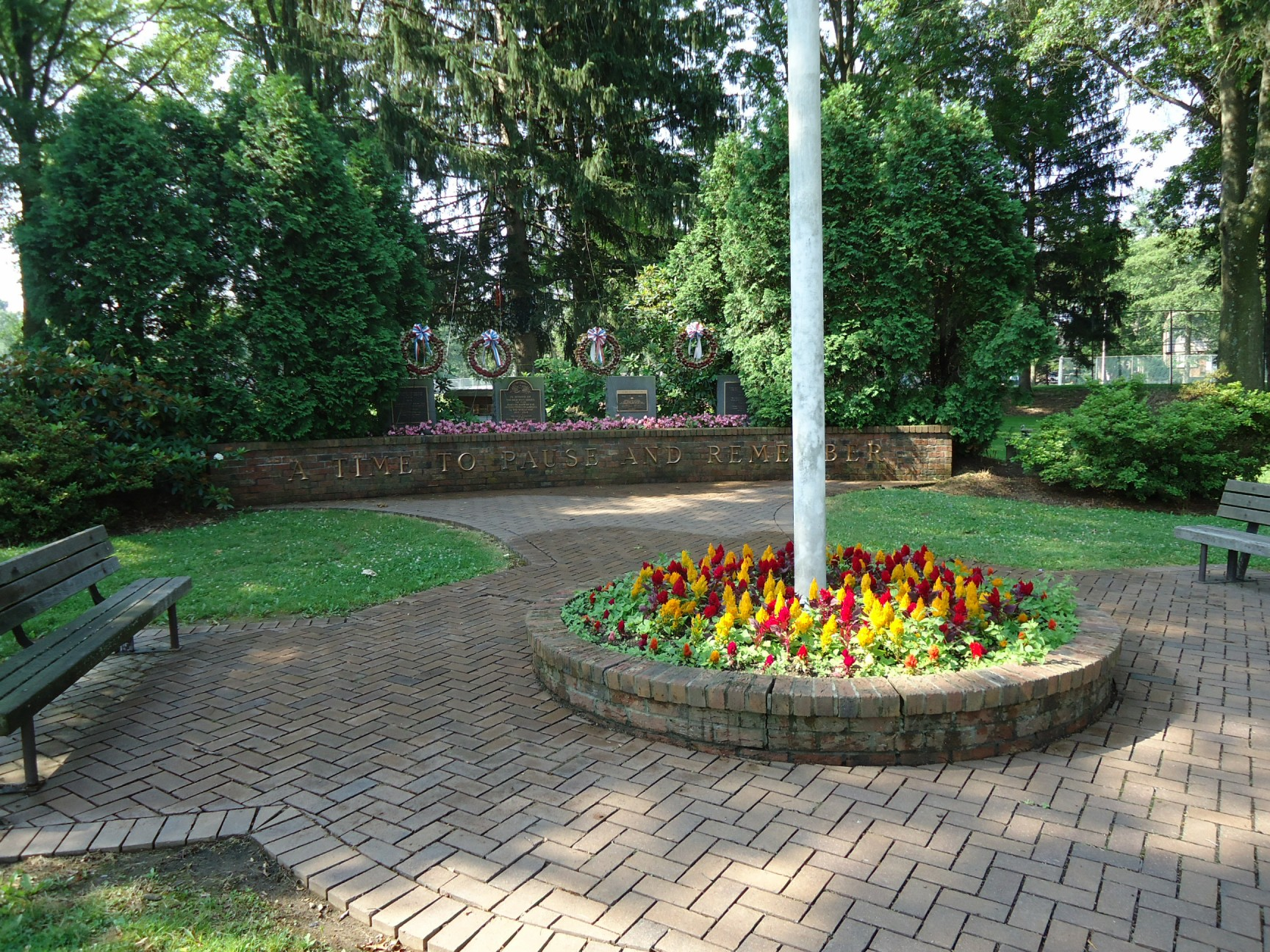
Memorial park

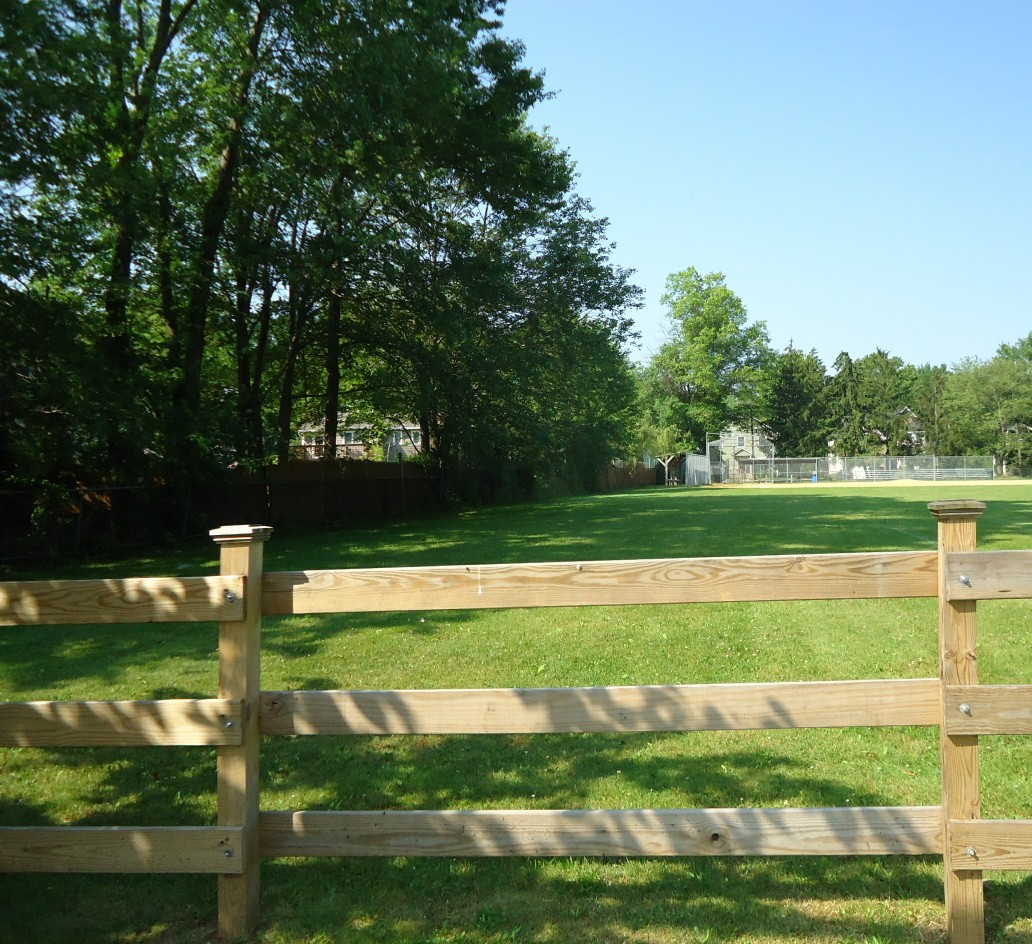
Playing field

Located in Berkeley Heights are many municipal parks, including the largest one, Columbia Park (located along Plainfield Avenue). Columbia Park boasts tennis courts, two baseball fields, basketball courts, and a large children's play area. It is operated by the Recreation Commission. In addition to those located at each of the schools, athletic fields are located along Horseshoe Road (Sansone Field) and along Springfield Avenue (Passaic River Park).

There are three swimming clubs located in Berkeley Heights: the Berkeley Heights Community Pool (Locust Avenue), the Berkeley Swim Club (behind Columbia Park), and Berkeley Aquatic (off of Springfield Avenue).

The Watchung Reservation and Passaic River Parkway are in the township and maintained by Union County. The Watchung Reservation has hiking trails, horseback riding trails, a large lake (Lake Surprise), the deserted community of Feltville and picnic areas.

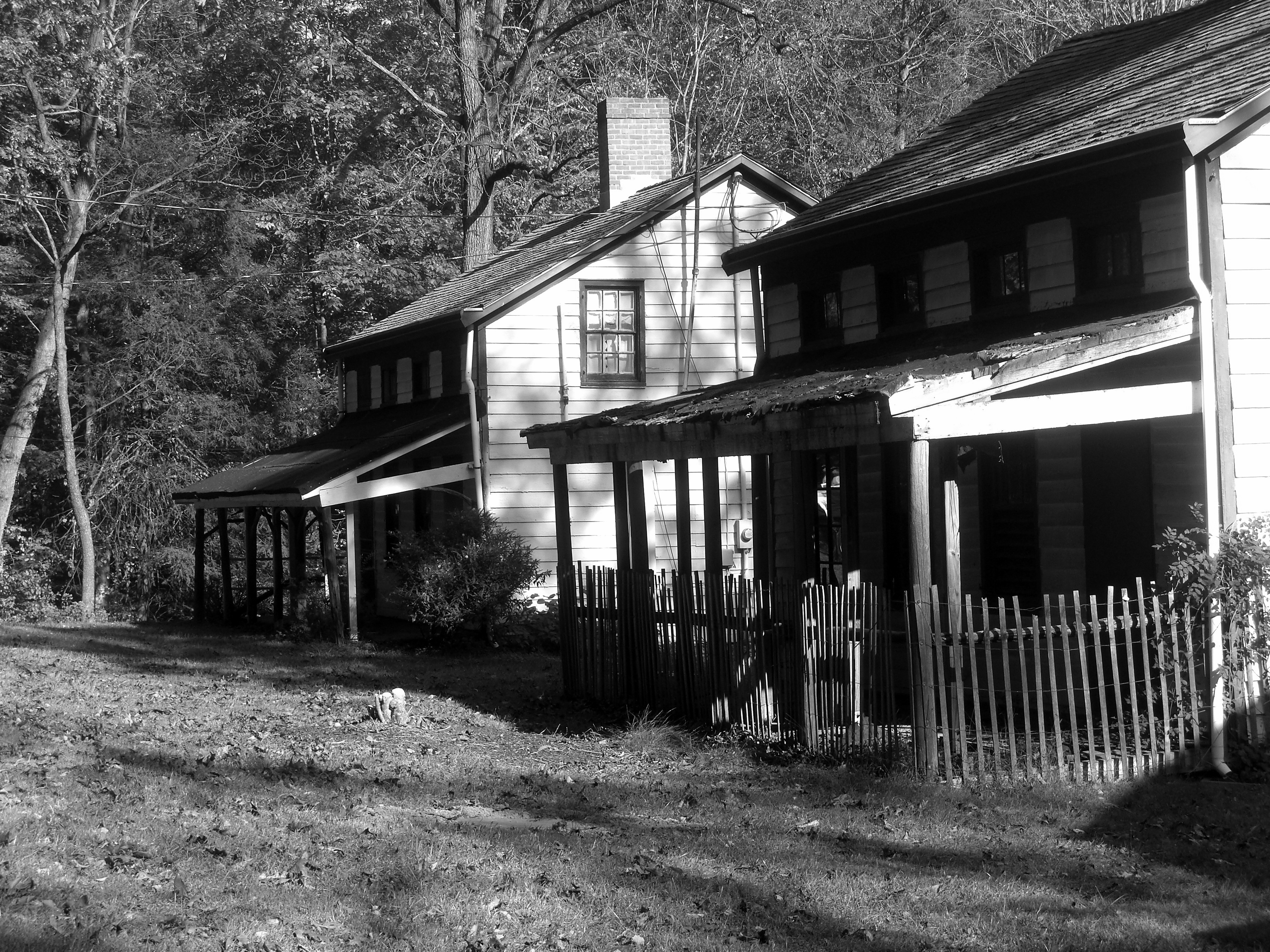
Feltville

== Government ==
=== Local government ===
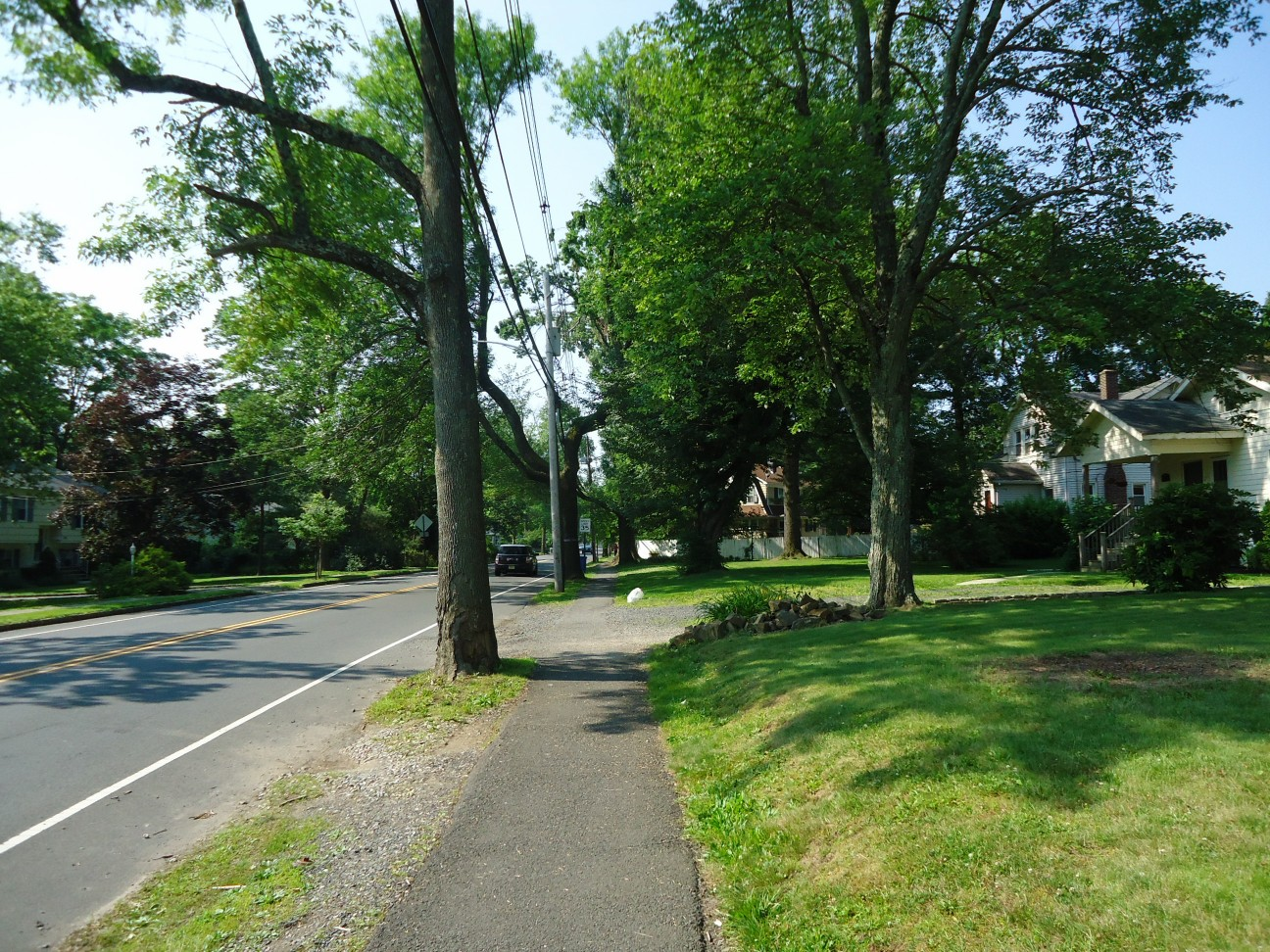
Plainfield Avenue

In accordance with a ballot question that was passed in November 2005, Berkeley Heights switched from a Township Committee form to a Mayor-Council-Administrator form of government under the Faulkner Act. The township is one of three municipalities (of the 564) statewide that use this form of government. The switch took effect on January 1, 2007. In the elections in fall 2006, all seats were open. Under the new form of government, the mayor is directly elected to a four-year term. The Township Committee has been replaced with a Township Council comprised of six members elected to staggered, three-year terms. With all six Township Council seats open in 2006, two councilpersons were elected to one-year terms, after which those seats were open for three-year terms in 2007. Two other seats were open for two-year terms in 2006. The final two were open for three-year terms from the beginning. The responsibilities of the Township Administrator are unchanged.

As of 2026, the Mayor of Berkeley Heights is Democrat Angie D. Devanney, whose term of office ends on December 31, 2026. Members of the Township Council are Council President John Foster (R, 2027), Council Vice President Susan Poage (D, 2028), Margaret Illis (D, 2026), Bill Machado (D, 2026), Alvaro Medeiros (D, 2028), and Andrew Moran (D, 2027).

The Council President serves as Acting Mayor in the Mayor's absence; the Council Vice President serves as Acting Mayor in the absence of both the Mayor and the Council President.

The Berkeley Heights Municipal Complex, located at 29 Park Avenue, was completed in December 2020.

=== Federal, state and county representation ===
Berkeley Heights is located in the 7th Congressional District and is part of New Jersey's 21st state legislative district.

For the 119th United States Congress, New Jersey's 7th congressional district is represented by Thomas Kean Jr. (R, Westfield). New Jersey is represented in the United States Senate by Democrats Cory Booker (Newark, term ends 2027) and Andy Kim (Moorestown, term ends 2031).

For the 2026–2027 session, the 21st legislative district of the New Jersey Legislature is represented in the State Senate by Jon Bramnick (R, Westfield) and in the General Assembly by Vincent Kearney (D, Garwood) and Andrew Macurdy (D, Summit).

Union County is governed by a Board of County Commissioners, whose nine members are elected at-large to three-year terms of office on a staggered basis with three seats coming up for election each year, with an appointed County Manager overseeing the day-to-day operations of the county. At an annual reorganization meeting held in the beginning of January, the board selects a Chair and Vice Chair from among its members. As of 2026, Union County's County Commissioners are:

Vice Chair Rebecca Williams (D, Plainfield, 2028), Chairman Joesph Bodek (D, Linden, 2026), James E. Baker Jr. (D, Rahway, 2027), Michele Delisfort (D, Union Township, 2026), Lourdes M. Leon (D, Elizabeth, 2026), Alexander Mirabella (D, Fanwood, 2027) Kimberly Palmieri-Mouded (D, Westfield, 2027). Stanley J. Neron (D, Elizabeth, 2028), Joseph Signorello III (D, Roselle Park, 2028)

Constitutional officers elected on a countywide basis are: Clerk Vacant - Incumbent Clerk Joanne Rajoppi (D, Union Township) died on July 16, 2026. Her death triggered a special election for a full five-year term to be held concurrently with the November 2026 general election. Deputy Clerk Clara Fernández assumes the powers of the office until the vacancy is filled. Sheriff Peter Corvelli (D, Kenilworth, 2026) and Surrogate Christopher E. Hudak (D, Clark, 2027).

=== Politics ===
As of May 18, 2017, there were a total of 9,558 registered voters in Berkeley Heights Township, of which 2,387 (25.0% vs. 45.2% countywide) were registered as Democrats, 3,368 (35.2% vs. 14.9%) were registered as Republicans and 3,780 (39.5% vs. 39.4%) were registered as Unaffiliated. There were 23 voters registered as Libertarians or Greens. Among the township's 2010 Census population, 68.8% (vs. 53.3% in Union County) were registered to vote, including 94.2% of those ages 18 and over (vs. 70.6% countywide).

United States presidential election results for Berkeley Heights
Year	Republican		Democratic		Third party(ies)	
Year	No.	%	No.	%	No.	%
2024	3,553	43.11%	4,531	54.97%	158	1.92%
2020	3,562	42.55%	4,688	56.00%	122	1.46%
2016	3,359	47.24%	3,482	48.97%	270	3.80%
2012	3,897	56.71%	2,899	42.19%	76	1.11%
2008	4,011	55.72%	3,094	42.98%	93	1.29%
2004	4,146	57.38%	3,019	41.79%	60	0.83%

In the 2016 presidential election, Democrat Hillary Clinton received 3,482 votes (48.23% vs. 65.94% countywide), ahead of Republican Donald Trump with 3,359 votes (46.53% vs. 30.47% countywide), and other candidates with 378 votes (5.1% vs 3.6% countywide) among the 7,325 ballots cast by the township's 9,775 voters, for a turnout of 74.9% In the 2012 presidential election, Republican Mitt Romney received 3,897 votes (57.3% vs. 32.3% countywide), ahead of Democrat Barack Obama with 2,799 votes (41.1% vs. 66.0%) and other candidates with 76 votes (1.1% vs. 0.8%), among the 6,802 ballots cast by the township's 9,400 registered voters, for a turnout of 72.4% (vs. 68.8% in Union County). In the 2008 presidential election, Republican John McCain received 4,011 votes (55.3% vs. 35.2% countywide), ahead of Democrat Barack Obama with 3,094 votes (42.7% vs. 63.1%) and other candidates with 93 votes (1.3% vs. 0.9%), among the 7,248 ballots cast by the township's 9,375 registered voters, for a turnout of 77.3% (vs. 74.7% in Union County).

Gubernatorial election results for Berkeley Heights
Year	Republican		Democratic		Third party(ies)	
Year	No.	%	No.	%	No.	%
2025	3,012	44.01%	3,807	55.63%	25	0.37%
2021	2,688	50.31%	2,625	49.13%	30	0.56%
2017	2,173	49.35%	2,076	47.15%	154	3.50%
2013	3,145	72.17%	1,150	26.39%	63	1.45%
2009	3,136	60.70%	1,589	30.76%	441	8.54%
2005	2,880	57.51%	1,973	39.40%	155	3.10%

In the 2021 gubernatorial election, Republican Jack Ciattarelli received 2,688 votes (50.3% vs. 37.6% countywide), ahead of Democrat Phil Murphy with 2,625 votes (49.1% vs. 61.6%), and other candidates with 30 votes (0.6% vs. 0.8%), among the 5,405 ballots cast by the township's 10,415 registered voters, for a turnout of 51.9%. In the 2017 gubernatorial election, Republican Kim Guadagno received 2,173 votes (49.4% vs. 32.6% countywide), ahead of Democrat Phil Murphy with 2,076 votes (47.1% vs. 65.2%), and other candidates with 154 votes (3.5% vs. 2.1%), among the 4,522 ballots cast by the township's 9,678 registered voters, for a turnout of 46.7%. In the 2013 gubernatorial election, Republican Chris Christie received 72.2% of the vote (3,145 cast), ahead of Democrat Barbara Buono with 26.4% (1,150 votes), and other candidates with 1.4% (63 votes), among the 4,457 ballots cast by the township's 9,193 registered voters (99 ballots were spoiled), for a turnout of 48.5%.

United States Senate election results for Berkeley Heights1
Year	Republican		Democratic		Third party(ies)	
Year	No.	%	No.	%	No.	%
2024	3,508	44.07%	4,326	54.35%	126	1.58%
2018	2,931	52.74%	2,375	42.74%	251	4.52%
2012	3,463	55.68%	2,634	42.35%	122	1.96%
2006	3,007	58.48%	2,037	39.61%	98	1.91%

United States Senate election results for Berkeley Heights2
Year	Republican		Democratic		Third party(ies)	
Year	No.	%	No.	%	No.	%
2020	3,814	46.15%	4,364	52.80%	87	1.05%
2014	2,034	56.86%	1,476	41.26%	67	1.87%
2013	1,656	56.73%	1,236	42.34%	27	0.92%
2008	3,786	58.85%	2,504	38.92%	143	2.22%

== Education ==
=== Public schools ===
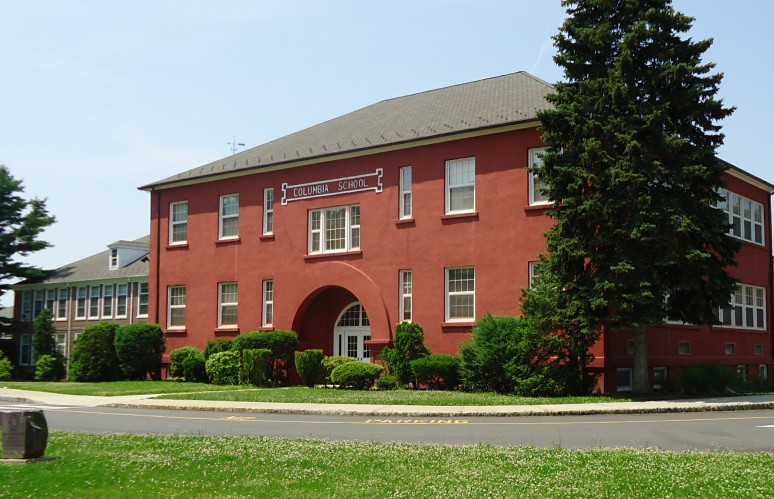
Columbia Middle School on Plainfield Avenue

The Berkeley Heights Public Schools serves students in pre-kindergarten through twelfth grade. As of the 2023–24 school year, the district, comprised of six schools, had an enrollment of 2,441 students and 225.3 classroom teachers (on an FTE basis), for a student–teacher ratio of 10.8:1. Schools in the district (with 2023–24 enrollment data from the National Center for Education Statistics) are Mary Kay McMillin Early Childhood Center with 249 students in grades PreK–2, William Woodruff Elementary School with 243 students in grades K–2, Thomas P. Hughes Elementary School with 270 students in grades 3–5, Mountain Park Elementary School with 214 students in grades 3–5, Columbia Middle School with 536 students in grades 6–8 and Governor Livingston High School with 920 students in grades 9–12.

The district's high school serves public school students of Berkeley Heights, along with approximately 300 students from neighboring Borough of Mountainside who are educated at the high school as part of a sending/receiving relationship with the Mountainside School District. Governor Livingston provides programs for deaf, hard of hearing and cognitively-impaired students in the district and those who are enrolled from all over north-central New Jersey who attend on a tuition basis.

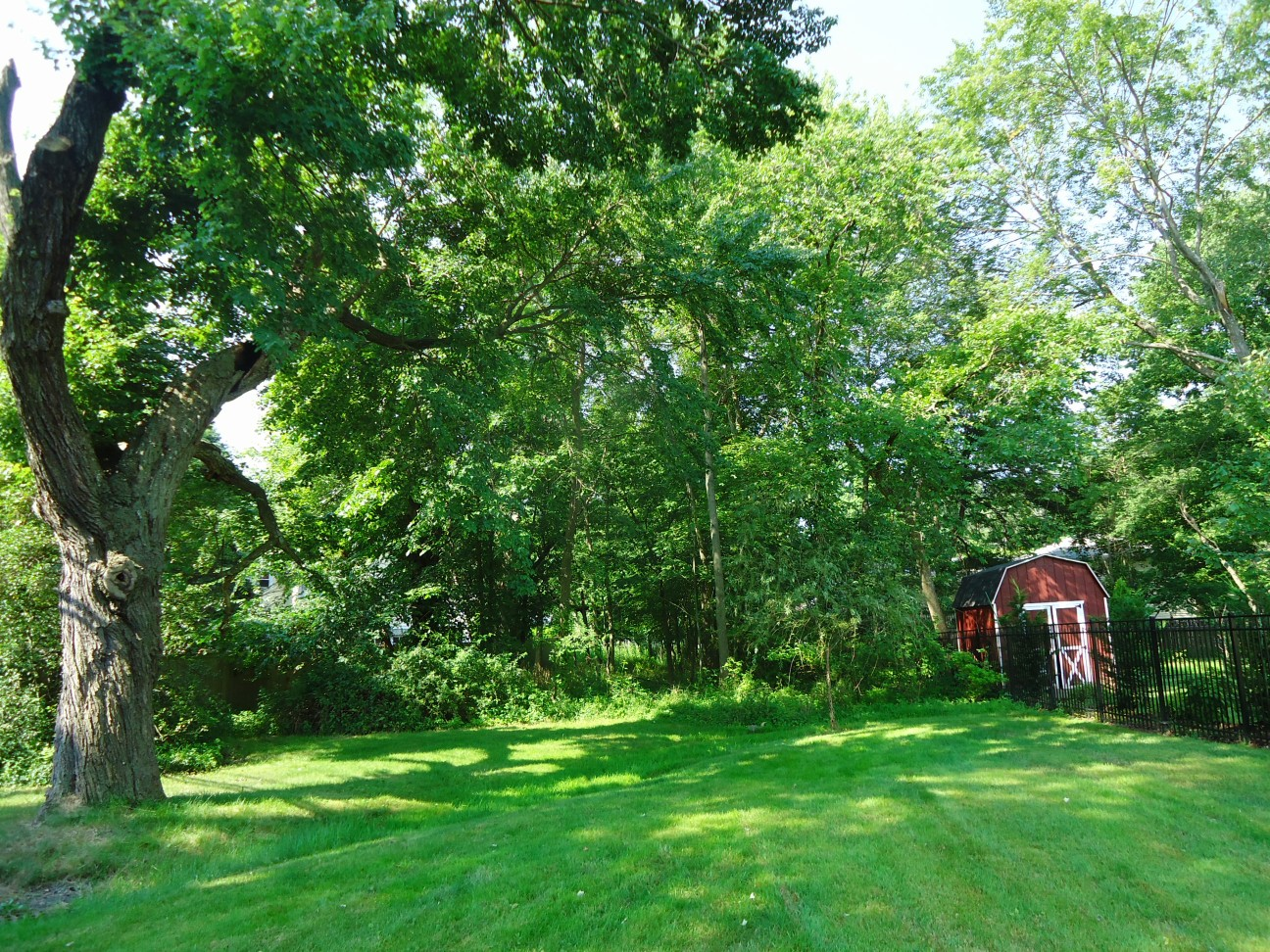
A wooded area

Governor Livingston was the 30th-ranked public high school in New Jersey out of 305 schools statewide in New Jersey Monthly magazine's September 2018 cover story on the state's "Top Public High Schools".

=== Private schools ===
There are four private pre-kindergarten schools in Berkeley Heights. The Westminster Nursery School is located at the corner of Plainfield Avenue and Mountain Avenue, the Union Village Nursery is located bordering Warren Township at the corner of Mountain Avenue and Hillcrest Road, the Diamond Hill Montessori is located along Diamond Hill Road opposite McMane Avenue and Primrose on Springfield Avenue.

FlexSchool, a private school for twice-exceptional and gifted fifth through twelfth graders, is the only private secondary school in Berkeley Heights.

== Infrastructure ==
=== Transportation ===
==== Roads and highways ====
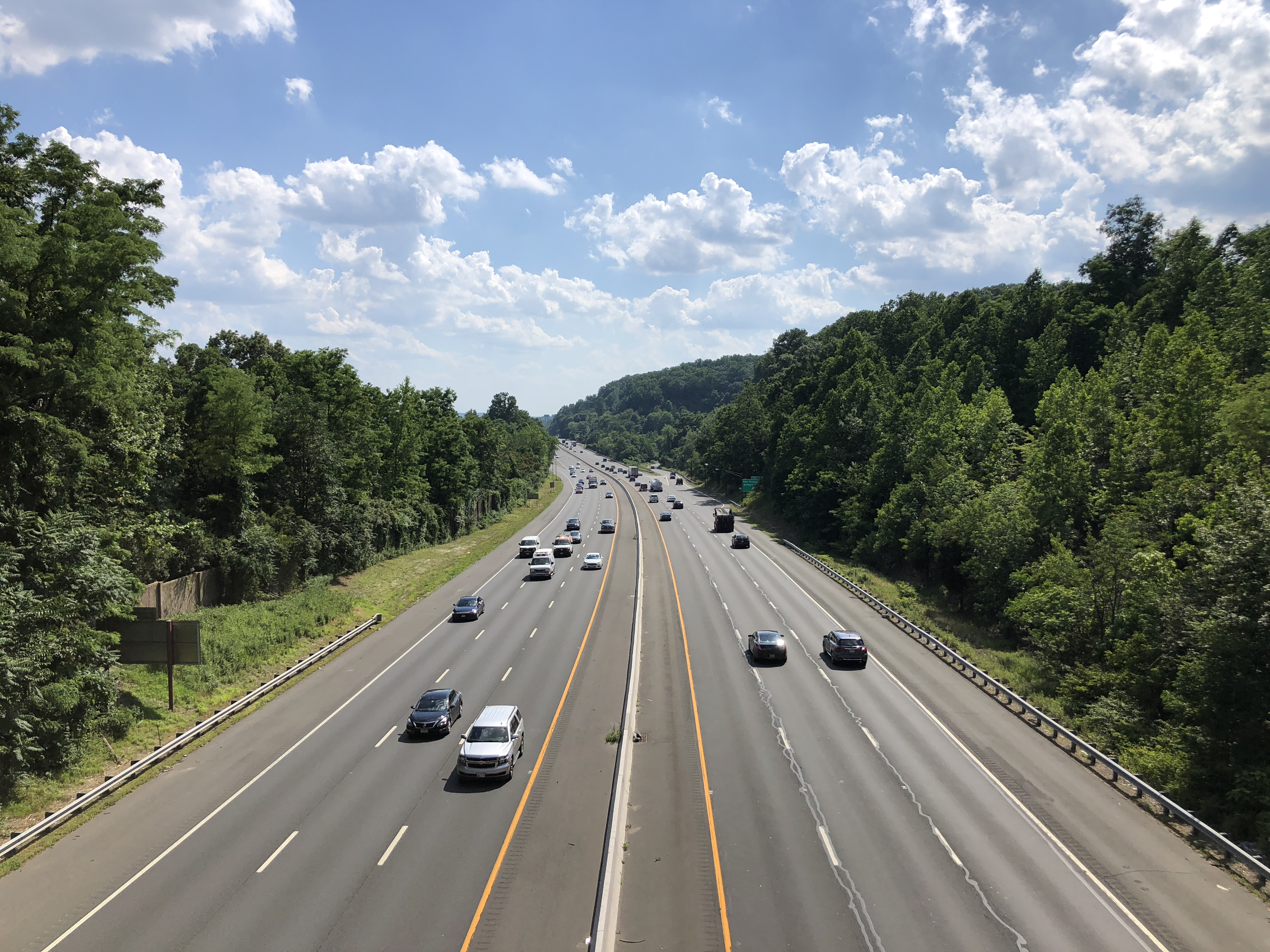
Interstate 78 in Berkeley Heights

As of May 2010, the township had a total of 65.73 miles (105.78 km) of roadways, of which 50.46 miles (81.21 km) were maintained by the municipality, 12.11 miles (19.49 km) by Union County and 3.16 miles (5.09 km) by the New Jersey Department of Transportation.

The most significant highway serving Berkeley Heights is Interstate 78, which runs from New York City to Pennsylvania. Other major roads in Berkeley Heights include Springfield Avenue, Mountain Avenue, Snyder Avenue, Plainfield Avenue, and Park Avenue. Springfield Avenue and Mountain Avenue run east–west, Snyder Avenue and Plainfield Avenue run north–south, while Park Avenue runs northeast–southwest. Each of these roads is heavily residential (except parts of Springfield Avenue) with only one travel lane in each direction.

==== Public transportation ====
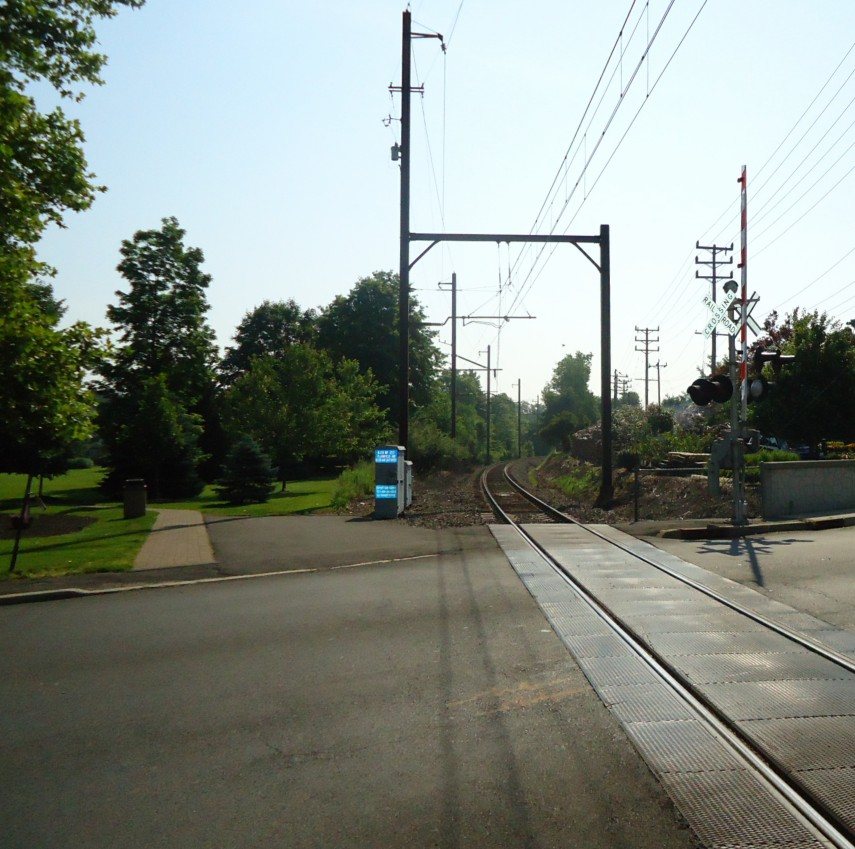
Commuter train tracks headed eastbound to New York City

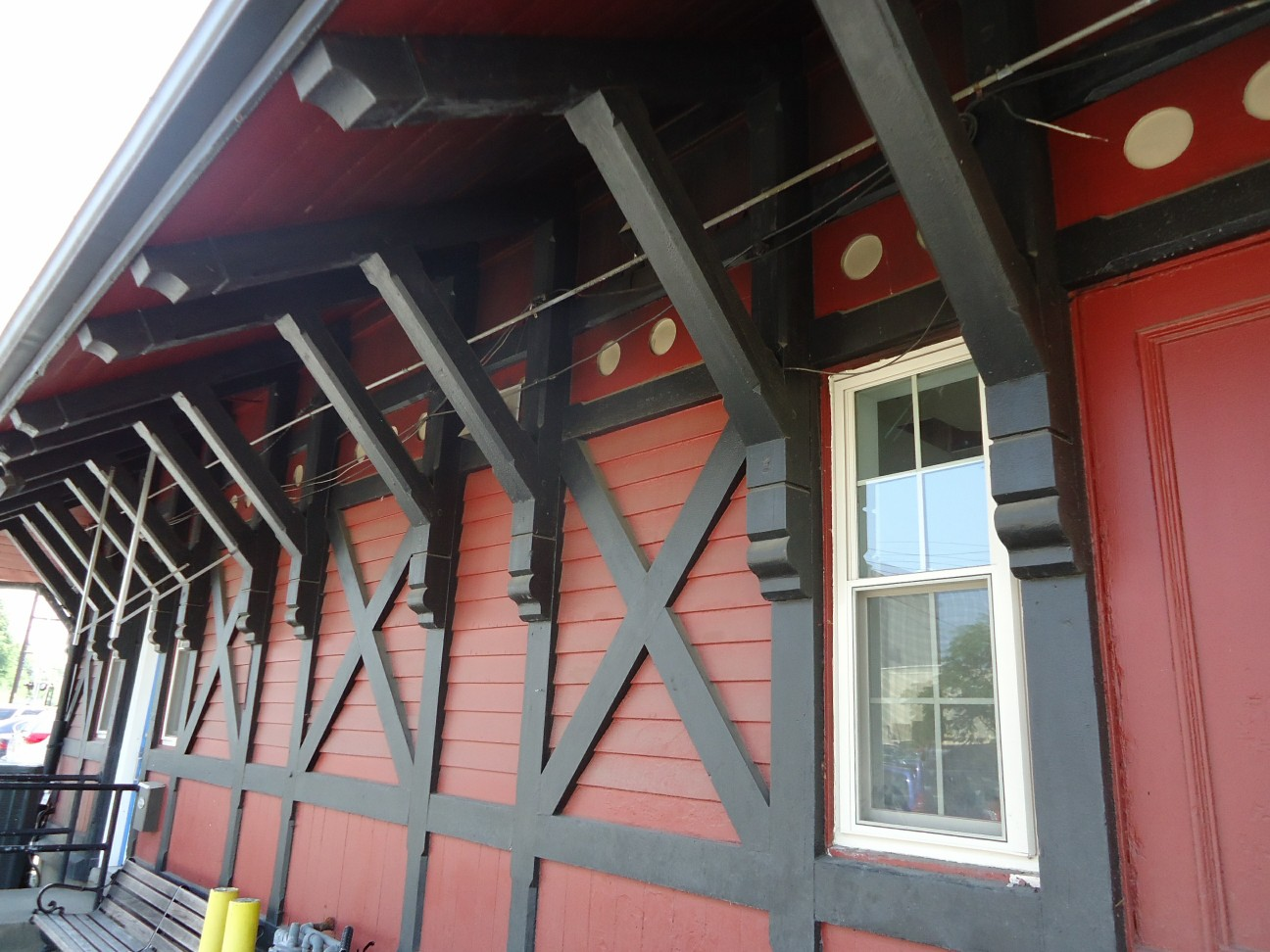
Train station

NJ Transit provides commuter rail service at the Berkeley Heights station. Trains serve Hoboken Terminal, Newark Broad Street Station, and New York Penn Station in Midtown Manhattan as part of the Gladstone Branch. Berkeley Heights is also in close proximity of the Summit station, which provides frequent commuter rail service to New York City.

NJ Transit offers bus service to Plainfield and Summit on the 986 route. Lakeland Bus Lines also provides commuter bus service to the Port Authority Bus Terminal in Midtown Manhattan and a connection to Gladstone.

Freight rail transportation had been provided by Norfolk Southern via off-peak use of New Jersey Transit's Gladstone Branch line until a final run on November 7, 2008, after 126 years of service. The Berkeley Heights plant of Reheis Chemical located on Snyder Avenue was the last freight customer on the Gladstone Branch, receiving shipments of hydrochloric acid.

Newark Liberty International Airport is approximately 18 miles (29 km) east of Berkeley Heights.

=== Healthcare ===
The Summit Medical Group, located on Mountain Avenue, is the main medical facility in Berkeley Heights.

=== Public library ===
Originally opened in 1949, Berkeley Heights Public Library closed its doors to the public at its 290 Plainfield Avenue location. It was moved to a temporary home at 110 Roosevelt Avenue, otherwise known as the Little Flower Church Rectory. The library is a member of the Infolink region of libraries, the Morris Union Federation (MUF) and the Middlesex Union Reciprocal Agreement Libraries (MURAL).

=== Berkeley Heights Police Department ===
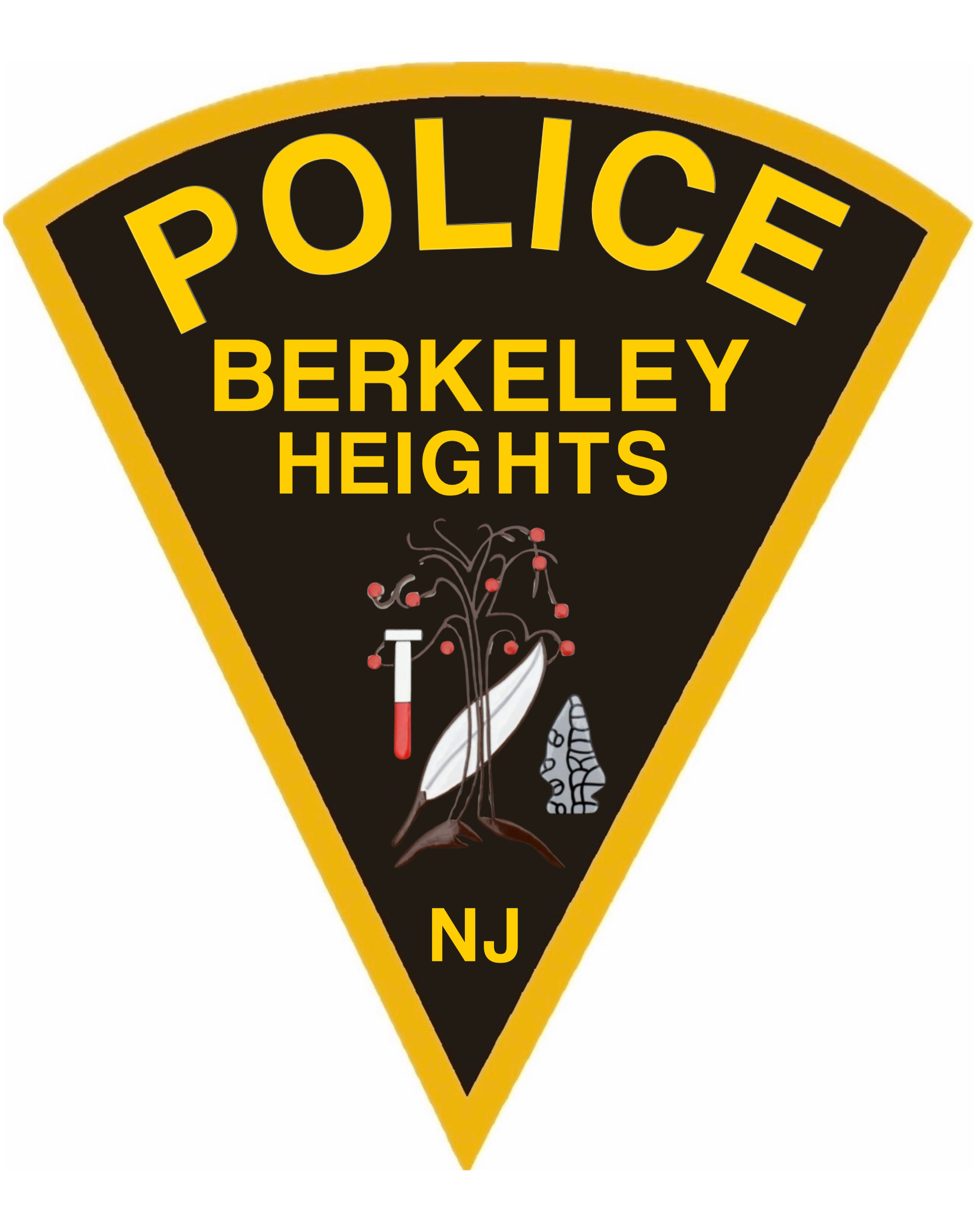
Berkeley Heights Police Department Patch 2024

The Berkeley Heights Police Department is located at the Municipal Building, 29 Park Avenue. The Berkeley Heights Police Department celebrated its 100-year anniversary in 2024. The first police officer was Dominick Russo, who was appointed in 1924. He would later serve as its first Chief of Police. Today, the Berkeley Heights Police Department consists of 28 sworn officers and is led by Chief of Police William A. Ives.

Berkeley Heights Fire Department & Rescue Squad

The Berkeley Heights Volunteer Rescue Squad, founded in 1942, is located at the corner of Snyder Avenue and Locust Avenue. The closest trauma centers are Morristown Medical Center (in Morristown) and University Hospital in Newark. The closest hospital emergency room is Overlook Hospital in Summit. The all-volunteer Rescue Squad provides emergency medical services to the township seven days per week. As of April 2019, the squad had 60 riding members including college and high school students of which 32 are certified EMTs.

The Berkeley Heights Fire Department is a volunteer fire department commanded by Chief James Hopkins. In addition to fire suppression, the department has members trained to respond to technical rescue and hazardous materials releases.

== Notable people ==
People who were born in, residents of, or otherwise closely associated with Berkeley Heights include:

- Al Aronowitz (1928–2005), rock journalist who claimed that Bob Dylan wrote his famous "Mr. Tambourine Man" in Aronowitz's former Berkeley Heights home
- Steve Balboni (born 1957), former New York Yankee
- Dennis Boutsikaris (born 1952), actor
- Griffin Maxwell Brooks (born 2000), college diver, TikTok influencer, and self-described "digital club kid" and socialite
- Jim Brown, soccer player
- James Cagney (1899–1986), actor who resided in Free Acres
- David Cantor (born 1954), actor
- John Carlini, jazz guitarist
- Ronald Chen (born 1958), former Public Advocate of New Jersey, nominated to fill the position on January 5, 2006, by Governor of New Jersey Jon Corzine
- Christopher Durang (1949–2024), playwright and actor
- Cathy Engelbert (born 1965), CEO of Deloitte, first female CEO of a major U.S. accounting firm
- Lauren Beth Gash (born 1960), lawyer and politician who served in the Illinois House of Representatives from 1993 to 2001
- Gina Genovese (born 1959), businesswoman and politician who has served as mayor of Long Hill Township
- Scott M. Gimple (born 1971), television and comic book writer
- Bolton Hall (1854–1938), founder of Free Acres
- Judy Joo, chef, author, restaurateur and television personality
- MacKinlay Kantor (1904–1977), screenwriter and novelist who had resided in Free Acres
- Harry Kelly (1871–1953), anarchist
- Victor Kilian (1891–1979), actor
- P. F. Kluge (born 1942), novelist
- Mary Jo Kopechne (1940–1969), political aide who drowned off Chappaquiddick Island when Senator Ted Kennedy (D-Mass.) drove his car off a bridge on July 18, 1969 and failed to seek help
- Arthur Manner (1912–1981), politician who served in the New Jersey General Assembly from 1972 to 1974 and as mayor of Berkeley Heights
- John R. Pierce (1910–2002), communications engineer, scientist and father of the communications satellite
- Jerry Ragonese (born 1986), professional lacrosse player for the Redwoods Lacrosse Club of the Premier Lacrosse League
- Juliette Reilly (born 1993), singer and YouTube personality
- Dennis Ritchie (1941–2011), creator of the C programming language and co-inventor of the UNIX operating system
- Bertha Runkle (1879–1958), novelist and playwright
- Peter Sagal (born 1965), playwright, screenwriter, actor, and host of the National Public Radio game show Wait Wait... Don't Tell Me!
- Jill Santoriello, playwright and author of the Broadway musical A Tale of Two Cities, graduated from Governor Livingston High School
- Thorne Smith (1892–1934), author
- Zenon Snylyk (1923–2002), soccer player
- Katie Stout (born 1989), artist and designer whose work has been described as "naive pop."
- Betty Wilson (born 1932), politician who served in the New Jersey General Assembly from 1974 to 1976
