= Governor Livingston High School =

High school in Union County, New Jersey, US

Location
- 175 Watchung Boulevard; Berkeley Heights, Union County, New Jersey 07922; United States; 40.686823°N 74.388027°W

Information
- Type: Public high school
- Motto: Explore, Excel, Engage
- Established: 1960
- School district: Berkeley Heights Public Schools
- NCES School ID: 340153000201
- Principal: Meg Berry
- Faculty: 81.9 FTEs
- Grades: 9-12
- Enrollment: 849 (as of 2024–25)
- Student to teacher ratio: 10.4:1
- Campus: Suburban
- Colors: Scarlet and navy blue
- Athletics conference: Union County Interscholastic Athletic Conference (general); Big Central Football Conference (football)
- Mascot: Hank the Highlander
- Team name: Highlanders
- Newspaper: The Highlander
- Yearbook: The Claymore
- Website: www.bhpsnj.org/o/glhs

Governor Livingston High School is a comprehensive four-year co-educational public high school serving students in ninth through twelfth grades, located in Berkeley Heights, in Union County, in the U.S. state of New Jersey, and operating as the lone secondary school of the Berkeley Heights Public Schools.

Since the 1970s, Governor Livingston has provided programs for deaf, hard of hearing and cognitively-impaired students in the district and those who are enrolled from all over north-central New Jersey who attend on a tuition basis.

== History ==
Union County Regional High School District was established in 1937, as the first regional high school district in New Jersey, for the students from the municipalities of Berkeley Heights, Clark, Garwood, Kenilworth, Mountainside, and Springfield. At that time, all students residing in the district attended Jonathan Dayton High School in Springfield. As the district began to grow, additional schools were needed. In November 1953, voters approved a $1.95 million bond referendum that included funds to purchase a site in Berkeley Heights for a third high school. In April 1957, voters approved a $3.8 million bond referendum that included funds to construct a high school on the Berkeley Heights site. The name "Governor Livingston Regional High School" was chosen in September 1959, though there was criticism about potential confusion with Livingston High School located 10 miles (16 km) away in Livingston, New Jersey. In September 1960, the school opened its doors to 800 students from Berkeley Heights and Mountainside. The regional district's superintendent at the time was Dr. Warren Davis and Frederick Aho was the first principal of the high school.

The school and its property have been expanded several times in subsequent years. In September 1960, just several weeks after opening, voters approved a $1.5 million referendum to construct two additions containing 20 classrooms, a boys' gymnasium, and a new library, as well as improve parking and athletic areas, which opened to students in September 1962 and January 1963. The school was built adjacent to an active Nike Missile Control Station in the Murray Hill section of Berkeley Heights which had opened in 1956; after the base was closed, the federal government gave the school district 6.3 acres (2.5 ha) of land that had been used for the defunct missile site. On May 4, 1971, voters approved a $4.7 million bond referendum to expand and renovate each school in the district. At Governor Livingston, the addition of an instructional media center and instrumental music room, and various renovations and expansions were completed by September 1973.

The high school's namesake is William Livingston, the first Governor of New Jersey and a signatory of the United States Constitution. The Royal Stewart tartan of the Stewart Clan (of whom Livingston was a member) is a symbol of the school and the tartan's red and blue colors are the high school's colors. The "Highlander" was chosen the school's mascot by student body vote in 1960, combining the tradition of the town's first baseball team and the location of the school at the highest point in Union County. The school adopted Claymore as the name for its yearbook.

Project Graduation, held the night of graduation and run entirely by volunteers, debuted in 1989, and provides a safe all-night celebration of each graduating class.

== Governance ==
In May 1996, the vote to de-regionalize the school district passed and the incoming freshmen in the fall of 1997 were the first to enter Governor Livingston High School, which became part of the Berkeley Heights School District.

The school's principal is Meg Berry. Her administration team includes the two assistant principals and the athletic director.

== School structure ==
It is the sole secondary school for students from Berkeley Heights, along with approximately 300 students from neighboring Borough of Mountainside who are educated at the high school as part of a sending/receiving relationship with the Mountainside School District that is covered by an agreement that runs through the end of 2021–22 school year.

== Admissions ==
As of the 2024–25 school year, the school had an enrollment of 849 students and 81.9 classroom teachers (on an FTE basis), for a student–teacher ratio of 10.4:1. There were 20 students (2.4% of enrollment) eligible for free lunch and 6 (0.7% of students) eligible for reduced-cost lunch.

== Curriculum ==
The school has been accredited by the Middle States Association of Colleges and Schools Commission on Elementary and Secondary Schools since 1965.

Governor Livingston was the winner of the 1994, 1995, and 1996 New Jersey Science Olympiad Division C Championship, 1997 Division 5 National Champions for the Junior Engineering Technical Society's TEAMS competition and winners of the 1997 New Jersey Regional Science Bowl.

=== Deaf and Hard of Hearing Program ===
Governor Livingston has an extensive Deaf and Hard of Hearing program for students around Union County that has operated since 1976. The school's American Sign Language (ASL) and Junior National Association for the Deaf (JrNAD) clubs promote the cultural aspects of deafness that support a strong deaf peer group. The program offers a self-contained resource center, with general education classes offered on all academic levels, with elective classes and clubs, sports and after school activities offered on an inclusive basis, including a shared program available with Union County Vocational Technical School. Teachers of the deaf instruct using total communication techniques and support is provided for students with cochlear implants.

American Sign Language is offered to general students as a three-year world language program, and students enrolled in ASL classes have the opportunity to interact with the deaf and hard of hearing students which enables the students to both practice and enhance their signing skills.

== Extracurricular activities ==
=== Athletics ===
The Governor Livingston High School Highlanders compete in the Union County Interscholastic Athletic Conference, which is comprised of public and private high schools in Union County and was established following a reorganization of sports leagues in Northern New Jersey by the New Jersey State Interscholastic Athletic Association (NJSIAA). Before the NJSIAA's 2009 realignment, the school had competed in the Mountain Valley Conference, which included high schools in Essex County and Union County. With 747 students in grades 10–12, the school was classified by the NJSIAA for the 2019–20 school year as Group II for most athletic competition purposes, which included schools with an enrollment of 486 to 758 students in that grade range. The football team competes in Division 2A of the Big Central Football Conference, which includes 60 public and private high schools in Hunterdon, Middlesex, Somerset, Union and Warren counties, which are broken down into 10 divisions by size and location. The school was classified by the NJSIAA as Group II South for football for 2024–2026, which included schools with 514 to 685 students.

School colors are navy and scarlet. The school fields teams in varsity, junior varsity, and freshman football, boys and girls soccer, cross country, cheerleading, wrestling, basketball, indoor and outdoor track, baseball, softball, golf, swimming, tennis, field hockey, bowling, lacrosse, fencing and ice hockey. In September 2006, the school finished installing a FieldTurf on its football field, which is used primarily for football, soccer, lacrosse and field hockey.

The school participates as the host school / lead agency for a joint ice hockey team with New Providence High School. The co-op program operates under agreements scheduled to expire in June 2028.

- In 1965, the Governor Livingston Regional High School football team, coached by Jack Bicknell, was awarded by the NJSIAA with the school's first state championship, a North Jersey Group II title (as co-champion with Millburn High School), for a team that was undefeated, untied and nearly unscored on. In 2008, the football team qualified for the playoffs and reached the state sectional final, where it lost to James Caldwell High School at Giants Stadium by a score of 22–7.
- The boys' soccer team won NJSIAA Group II state championships in 1977 (defeating Lawrence High School in the finals), 1979 (vs. Freehold High School), 1984 (vs. Freehold) and 1994 (vs. Hopewell Valley Central High School).
- The wrestling team won North II Group II sectional championships in 1980, 1981, and 2022–23.
- The girls' soccer team won NJSIAA Group II state championships in 1985 and 2018.
- The baseball team won NJSIAA Group II state championships in 1999 (defeating runner-up Gateway Regional High School in the finals of the tournament), 2011 (vs. West Essex High School), 2015 (vs. Bernards High School) and 2024 (vs. Pascack Valley High School). The program won its second Group II state title in 2011 with a win in the finals against the West Essex High School Knights by a score of 8–2. In 2015, the team won its third Group II state championship with a 10–4 win in the tournament final against Bernards High School.
- The softball team won the 2007 Central, Group II state sectional championship with a string of shutout wins over Roselle Park High School (10-0), Shore Regional High School (6-0) and Delaware Valley Regional High School (1-0) in the tournament final. The team moved on to win the Group II state championship with wins over James Caldwell High School (4-2) and Pascack Hills High School (2-0) in the final game of the playoffs.
- The fencing program has won multiple state titles, including boys' sabre (2008), boys' foil (2015), girls' overall team and sabre (2009), and girls' foil (2012).
- Track:
  - The boys' track and field team won the NJSIAA Group II outdoor track state championship in 2017.
  - The track team won their fourth state sectional championship in the previous seven years.
  - In 2013, the boys track team won their fifth state sectional championship.
- The co-op ice hockey team won the Public Group C state championship in 2022 against the Morris Knolls High School / Morris Hills High School co-op team.

=== Marching band ===
The Governor Livingston Highlander Band competes in the Tournament of Bands circuit.

=== Clubs and student media ===
The school offers a variety of student clubs and activities, including foreign language clubs, drama, and community outreach programs. Students also operate GLTV, Comcast: 34 / FiOS: 47, a local-access television station that broadcasts school events and programming.

== Awards and recognition ==
In its 2013 report on "America's Best High Schools", The Daily Beast ranked the school 416th in the nation among participating public high schools and 35th among schools in New Jersey. In the 2011 "Ranking America's High Schools" issue by The Washington Post, the school was ranked 32nd in New Jersey and 1,112th nationwide. The school was ranked 416th in Newsweek's 2009 ranking of the top 1,500 high schools in the United States and was ranked 8th in New Jersey, with 2.293 AP tests taken in 2008 per graduating senior and 48% of all graduating seniors passing at least one AP exam; The school was ranked 707th nationwide in 2008. In Newsweek's 2007 rankings of the country's top 1,200 high schools, Governor Livingston High School was listed in 776th place, the 17th-highest ranked school in New Jersey. With the rankings calculated by Jay Mathews shifted to The Washington Post in 2011, the school was ranked 31st in New Jersey and 1,071st nationwide.

The school was the 36th-ranked public high school in New Jersey out of 339 schools statewide in New Jersey Monthly magazine's September 2014 cover story on the state's "Top Public High Schools", using a new ranking methodology. The school had also been ranked 36th in the state of 328 schools in 2012, after being ranked 24th in 2010 out of 322 schools listed. The magazine ranked the school 15th in 2008 out of 316 schools. The school was ranked 21st in the magazine's September 2006 issue, which included 316 schools across the state. Schooldigger.com ranked the school 26th out of 381 public high schools statewide in its 2011 rankings (an increase of 48 positions from the 2010 ranking) which were based on the combined percentage of students classified as proficient or above proficient on the mathematics (95.4%) and language arts literacy (98.4%) components of the High School Proficiency Assessment (HSPA).

In its listing of "America's Best High Schools 2016", Governor Livingston was ranked 192nd out of 500 best high schools in the country; it was ranked 30th among all high schools in New Jersey and 14th among non-magnet schools.

== Notable alumni ==
- Dennis Boutsikaris (born 1952), actor.
- Scott M. Gimple (born 1971, class of 1989), television and comic book writer.
- Jerry Ragonese (born 1986), lacrosse player.
- Juliette Reilly (born 1993), singer-songwriter and YouTuber.
- Peter Sagal (born 1965, class of 1983), playwright and host of NPR's Wait Wait... Don't Tell Me!.
- Jill Santoriello (class of 1983), Broadway playwright and composer, musical A Tale of Two Cities.
