= Mountainside, New Jersey =

Borough in Union County, New Jersey, US

- Borough
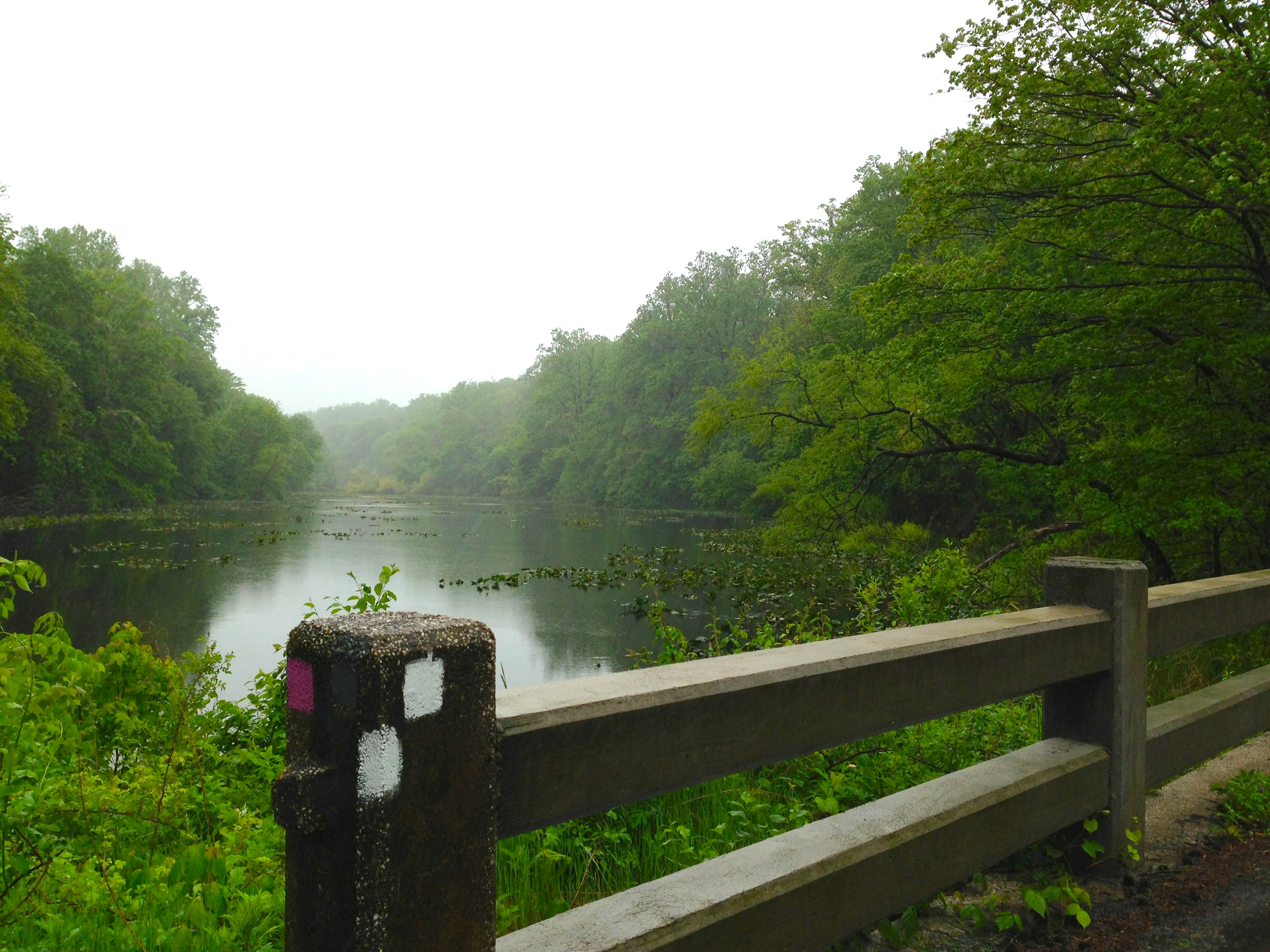
- Lake Surprise in Watchung Reservation

- Seal

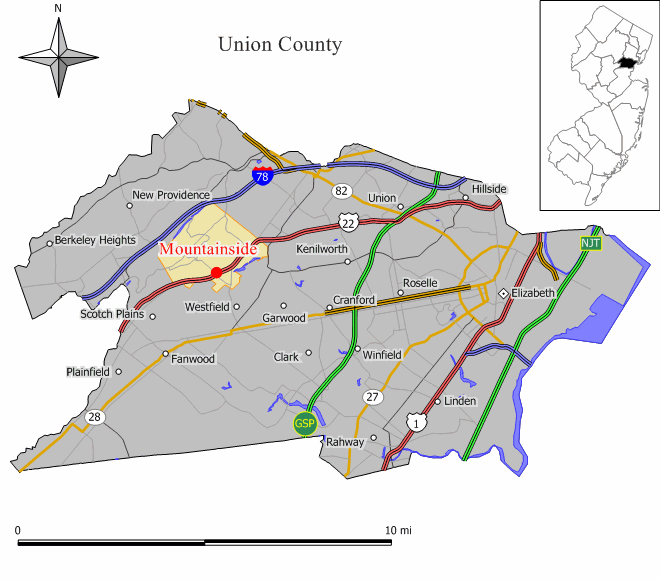
- Map of Mountainside in Union County. Inset: Union County highlighted in the State of New Jersey.

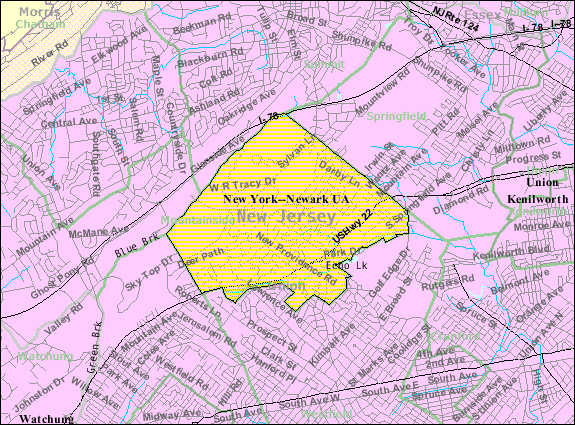
- Census Bureau map of Mountainside, New Jersey

- Location in Union County Location in New Jersey Location in the United States
- Coordinates: 40.680722°N 74.360292°W
- Country: United States
- State: New Jersey
- County: Union
- Incorporated: September 25, 1895

Government
  - Type: Faulkner Act (mayor–council)
  - Body: Borough Council
  - Mayor: Paul N. Mirabelli (R, term ends December 31, 2027)
  - Administrator: Glenn Mortimer
  - Municipal clerk: Martha Lopez

Area
  - Total: 4.04 sq mi (10.47 km^{2})
  - Land: 4.00 sq mi (10.35 km^{2})
  - Water: 0.046 sq mi (0.12 km^{2}) 1.11%
  - Rank: 295th of 565 in state 12th of 21 in county
- Elevation: 233 ft (71 m)

Population (2020)
  - Total: 7,020
  - Estimate (2023): 6,924
  - Rank: 319th of 565 in state 19th of 21 in county
  - Density: 1,756.8/sq mi (678.3/km^{2})
  - Rank: 312th of 565 in state 21st of 21 in county
- Time zone: UTC−05:00 (Eastern (EST))
  - Summer (DST): UTC−04:00 (Eastern (EDT))
- ZIP Code: 07092
- Area code: 908
- FIPS code: 3403948510
- GNIS feature ID: 0885311
- Website: www.mountainside-nj.com

Mountainside is a borough in Union County, in the U.S. state of New Jersey. The borough is located on a ridge in northern-central New Jersey, within the Raritan Valley and Rahway Valley regions in the New York metropolitan area. As of the 2020 United States census, the borough's population was 7,020, an increase of 335 (+5.0%) from the 2010 census count of 6,685, which in turn reflected an increase of 83 (+1.3%) from the 6,602 counted in the 2000 census.

Mountainside was incorporated as a borough on September 25, 1895, from portions of Westfield Township, based on the results of a referendum held the previous day.

New Jersey Monthly magazine ranked Mountainside as its 16th best place to live in its 2008 rankings of the "Best Places To Live" in New Jersey, as well as eighth in the 2010 list.

== History ==
In 1958, part of Nike missile battery (NY-73) was installed, with the missile launchers themselves in Mountainside while the radar station was installed in Berkeley Heights. It remained in operation until 1963. Remnants of the control site are located adjacent to Governor Livingston High School, while the part of Watchung Reservation that was cleared in order to accommodate the missile launchers became the Watchung Stables.

== Geography ==
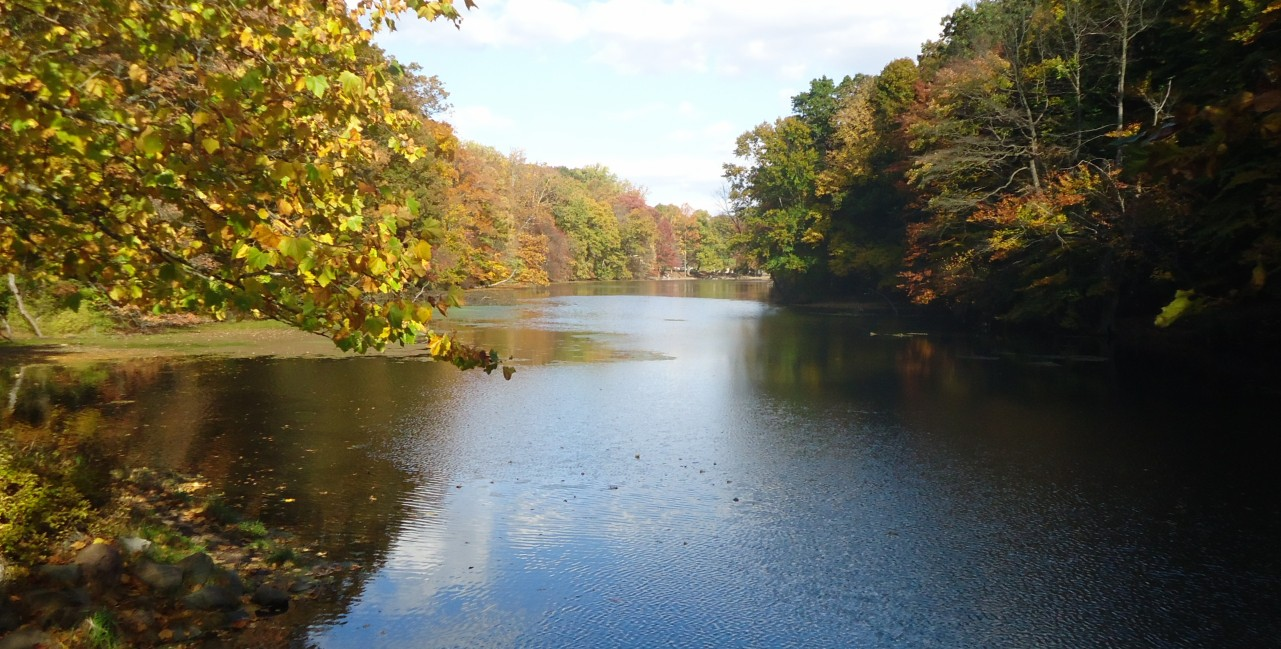
Echo Lake Park view in autumn.

According to the United States Census Bureau, the borough had a total area of 4.04 square miles (10.47 km^{2}), including 4.00 square miles (10.35 km^{2}) of land and 0.05 square miles (0.12 km^{2}) of water (1.11%).

Mountainside is bordered by the Union County municipalities of Summit to the north, by Springfield Township to the east, by Westfield to the south and by Berkeley Heights and Scotch Plains to the west.

== Demographics ==
Historical population
Census	Pop.	Note	%±
1900	367		—
1910	362		−1.4%
1920	493		36.2%
1930	965		95.7%
1940	1,148		19.0%
1950	2,046		78.2%
1960	6,325		209.1%
1970	7,520		18.9%
1980	7,118		−5.3%
1990	6,657		−6.5%
2000	6,602		−0.8%
2010	6,685		1.3%
2020	7,020		5.0%
2023 (est.)	6,924	▼	−1.4%
Population sources: 1900–1920; 1900–1910 1910–1930; 1940–2000 2000; 2010 2020

=== Racial and ethnic composition ===
Mountainside borough, New Jersey – Racial and ethnic composition Note: the US Census treats Hispanic/Latino as an ethnic category. This table excludes Latinos from the racial categories and assigns them to a separate category. Hispanics/Latinos may be of any race.
Race / Ethnicity (NH = Non-Hispanic)	Pop 2000	Pop 2010	Pop 2020	% 2000	% 2010	% 2020
White alone (NH)	6,111	5,754	5,498	92.56%	86.07%	78.32%
Black or African American alone (NH)	61	121	134	0.92%	1.81%	1.91%
Native American or Alaska Native alone (NH)	6	0	2	0.09%	0.00%	0.03%
Asian alone (NH)	180	323	466	2.73%	4.83%	6.64%
Native Hawaiian or Pacific Islander alone (NH)	4	0	0	0.06%	0.00%	0.00%
Other race alone (NH)	1	7	50	0.02%	0.10%	0.71%
Mixed race or Multiracial (NH)	40	73	203	0.61%	1.09%	2.89%
Hispanic or Latino (any race)	199	407	667	3.01%	6.09%	9.50%
Total	6,602	6,685	7,020	100.00%	100.00%	100.00%

=== 2020 census ===
As of the 2020 census, Mountainside had a population of 7,020. The median age was 46.6 years. 22.3% of residents were under the age of 18 and 22.9% of residents were 65 years of age or older. For every 100 females there were 97.1 males, and for every 100 females age 18 and over there were 92.8 males age 18 and over.

100.0% of residents lived in urban areas, while 0.0% lived in rural areas.

There were 2,399 households in Mountainside, of which 35.8% had children under the age of 18 living in them. Of all households, 71.8% were married-couple households, 7.0% were households with a male householder and no spouse or partner present, and 18.1% were households with a female householder and no spouse or partner present. About 15.7% of all households were made up of individuals and 11.1% had someone living alone who was 65 years of age or older.

There were 2,564 housing units, of which 6.4% were vacant. The homeowner vacancy rate was 2.0% and the rental vacancy rate was 21.3%.

=== 2010 census ===
The 2010 United States census counted 6,685 people, 2,468 households, and 1,866 families in the borough. The population density was 1,668.0 per square mile (644.0/km^{2}). There were 2,558 housing units at an average density of 638.3 per square mile (246.4/km^{2}). The racial makeup was 91.31% (6,104) White, 1.97% (132) Black or African American, 0.00% (0) Native American, 4.94% (330) Asian, 0.00% (0) Pacific Islander, 0.42% (28) from other races, and 1.36% (91) from two or more races. Hispanic or Latino of any race were 6.09% (407) of the population.

Of the 2,468 households, 30.8% had children under the age of 18; 66.7% were married couples living together; 6.5% had a female householder with no husband present and 24.4% were non-families. Of all households, 21.6% were made up of individuals and 15.6% had someone living alone who was 65 years of age or older. The average household size was 2.64 and the average family size was 3.10.

23.2% of the population were under the age of 18, 4.8% from 18 to 24, 18.2% from 25 to 44, 30.0% from 45 to 64, and 23.7% who were 65 years of age or older. The median age was 47.2 years. For every 100 females, the population had 92.7 males. For every 100 females ages 18 and older there were 88.1 males.

The Census Bureau's 2006–2010 American Community Survey showed that (in 2010 inflation-adjusted dollars) median household income was $116,210 (with a margin of error of +/− $22,182) and the median family income was $135,086 (+/− $14,679). Males had a median income of $95,030 (+/− $9,312) versus $58,818 (+/− $8,974) for females. The per capita income for the borough was $52,844 (+/− $5,530). About 1.5% of families and 3.5% of the population were below the poverty line, including 3.1% of those under age 18 and 8.1% of those age 65 or over.

=== 2000 census ===
As of the 2000 United States census there were 6,602 people, 2,434 households, and 1,925 families residing in the borough. The population density was 1,640.8 inhabitants per square mile (633.5/km^{2}). There were 2,478 housing units at an average density of 615.8 per square mile (237.8/km^{2}). The racial makeup of the borough was 95.09% White, 0.94% African American, 0.09% Native American, 2.80% Asian, 0.06% Pacific Islander, 0.27% from other races, and 0.74% from two or more races. Hispanic or Latino of any race were 3.01% of the population.

There were 2,434 households, out of which 29.3% had children under the age of 18 living with them, 71.9% were married couples living together, 5.3% had a female householder with no husband present, and 20.9% were non-families. 17.9% of all households were made up of individuals, and 11.9% had someone living alone who was 65 years of age or older. The average household size was 2.60 and the average family size was 2.95.

In the borough the population was spread out, with 21.1% under the age of 18, 3.8% from 18 to 24, 22.9% from 25 to 44, 27.3% from 45 to 64, and 24.9% who were 65 years of age or older. The median age was 46 years. For every 100 females, there were 89.2 males. For every 100 females age 18 and over, there were 87.1 males.

The median income for a household in the borough was $97,195, and the median income for a family was $105,773. Males had a median income of $78,595 versus $52,667 for females. The per capita income for the borough was $47,474. About 2.0% of families and 3.0% of the population were below the poverty line, including 1.9% of those under age 18 and 2.9% of those age 65 or over.

== Government ==
=== Local government ===
Mountainside is governed by a Mayor-Council form of government as authorized through the Option Municipal Charter Law (commonly called the Faulkner Act). The township is one of 71 municipalities (of the 564) statewide that use this form of government. The governing body is comprised of the mayor and the six-member borough council. Under this form of local government, the mayor is elected for a term of four years and there borough council members are elected for three-year terms, with two seats coming up for election each year in a three-year cycle. Both the mayor and Borough Council are elected at-large, that is, to represent the entire community. Elections for all officials in Mountainside are conducted on a partisan basis during the November General Election.

As of 2026, the mayor of Mountainside is Republican Paul N. Mirabelli, whose term of office ends on December 31, 2027. Members of the Borough Council are René Dierkes (R, 2028), Steven Matejek (R, 2026), Donna Pacifico (R, 2028), Donald Rinaldo Jr. (R, 2027), Alex Van Deusen (R, 2027), and Valerie Wass (R, 2026).

=== Federal, state and county representation ===
Mountainside is located in the 7th Congressional District and is part of New Jersey's 21st state legislative district.

For the 119th United States Congress, New Jersey's 7th congressional district is represented by Thomas Kean Jr. (R, Westfield). New Jersey is represented in the United States Senate by Democrats Cory Booker (Newark, term ends 2027) and Andy Kim (Moorestown, term ends 2031).

For the 2026–2027 session, the 21st legislative district of the New Jersey Legislature is represented in the State Senate by Jon Bramnick (R, Westfield) and in the General Assembly by Vincent Kearney (D, Garwood) and Andrew Macurdy (D, Summit).

Union County is governed by a Board of County Commissioners, whose nine members are elected at-large to three-year terms of office on a staggered basis with three seats coming up for election each year, with an appointed County Manager overseeing the day-to-day operations of the county. At an annual reorganization meeting held in the beginning of January, the board selects a Chair and Vice Chair from among its members. As of 2026, Union County's County Commissioners are:

Vice Chair Rebecca Williams (D, Plainfield, 2028), Chairman Joesph Bodek (D, Linden, 2026), James E. Baker Jr. (D, Rahway, 2027), Michele Delisfort (D, Union Township, 2026), Lourdes M. Leon (D, Elizabeth, 2026), Alexander Mirabella (D, Fanwood, 2027) Kimberly Palmieri-Mouded (D, Westfield, 2027). Stanley J. Neron (D, Elizabeth, 2028), Joseph Signorello III (D, Roselle Park, 2028)

Constitutional officers elected on a countywide basis are: Clerk Vacant - Incumbent Clerk Joanne Rajoppi (D, Union Township) died on July 16, 2026. Her death triggered a special election for a full five-year term to be held concurrently with the November 2026 general election. Deputy Clerk Clara Fernández assumes the powers of the office until the vacancy is filled. Sheriff Peter Corvelli (D, Kenilworth, 2026) and Surrogate Christopher E. Hudak (D, Clark, 2027).

=== Politics ===
As of March 2011, there were a total of 4,744 registered voters in Mountainside, of which 1,201 (25.3% vs. 41.8% countywide) were registered as Democrats, 1,568 (33.1% vs. 15.3%) were registered as Republicans and 1,974 (41.6% vs. 42.9%) were registered as Unaffiliated. There was one voter registered to another party. Among the borough's 2010 Census population, 71.0% (vs. 53.3% in Union County) were registered to vote, including 92.5% of those ages 18 and over (vs. 70.6% countywide).

United States presidential election results for Mountainside
Year	Republican		Democratic		Third party(ies)	
Year	No.	%	No.	%	No.	%
2024	2,275	51.44%	2,074	46.89%	74	1.67%
2020	2,251	49.64%	2,239	49.37%	45	0.99%
2016	2,094	54.35%	1,641	42.59%	118	3.06%
2012	2,100	59.47%	1,401	39.68%	30	0.85%
2008	2,331	60.33%	1,500	38.82%	33	0.85%
2004	2,215	57.76%	1,589	41.43%	31	0.81%

In the 2012 presidential election, Republican Mitt Romney received 2,100 votes (59.2% vs. 32.3% countywide), ahead of Democrat Barack Obama with 1,401 votes (39.5% vs. 66.0%) and other candidates with 30 votes (0.8% vs. 0.8%), among the 3,548 ballots cast by the borough's 4,940 registered voters, for a turnout of 71.8% (vs. 68.8% in Union County). In the 2008 presidential election, Republican John McCain received 2,331 votes (60.0% vs. 35.2% countywide), ahead of Democrat Barack Obama with 1,500 votes (38.6% vs. 63.1%) and other candidates with 33 votes (0.8% vs. 0.9%), among the 3,888 ballots cast by the borough's 4,911 registered voters, for a turnout of 79.2% (vs. 74.7% in Union County). In the 2004 presidential election, Republican George W. Bush received 2,215 votes (58.0% vs. 40.3% countywide), ahead of Democrat John Kerry with 1,561 votes (40.8% vs. 58.3%) and other candidates with 31 votes (0.8% vs. 0.7%), among the 3,822 ballots cast by the borough's 4,796 registered voters, for a turnout of 79.7% (vs. 72.3% in the whole county).

Gubernatorial election results for Mountainside
Year	Republican		Democratic		Third party(ies)	
Year	No.	%	No.	%	No.	%
2025	1,892	52.64%	1,694	47.13%	8	0.22%
2021	1,709	56.95%	1,275	42.49%	17	0.57%
2017	1,443	57.67%	1,020	40.77%	39	1.56%
2013	1,595	69.89%	661	28.97%	26	1.14%
2009	1,754	62.26%	842	29.89%	221	7.85%
2005	1,582	59.97%	990	37.53%	66	2.50%

In the 2017 gubernatorial election, Republican Kim Guadagno received 1,443 votes (57.7% vs. 32.6% countywide), ahead of Democrat Phil Murphy with 1,020 votes (40.8% vs. 65.2%), and other candidates with 39 votes (1.6% vs. 2.1%), among the 2,602 ballots cast by the borough's 5,190 registered voters, for a turnout of 50.1%. In the 2013 gubernatorial election, Republican Chris Christie received 69.9% of the vote (1,595 cast), ahead of Democrat Barbara Buono with 29.0% (661 votes), and other candidates with 1.1% (26 votes), among the 2,320 ballots cast by the borough's 4,860 registered voters (38 ballots were spoiled), for a turnout of 47.7%. In the 2009 gubernatorial election, Republican Chris Christie received 1,754 votes (61.8% vs. 41.7% countywide), ahead of Democrat Jon Corzine with 842 votes (29.6% vs. 50.6%), Independent Chris Daggett with 204 votes (7.2% vs. 5.9%) and other candidates with 17 votes (0.6% vs. 0.8%), among the 2,840 ballots cast by the borough's 4,827 registered voters, yielding a 58.8% turnout (vs. 46.5% in the county).

United States Senate election results for Mountainside1
Year	Republican		Democratic		Third party(ies)	
Year	No.	%	No.	%	No.	%
2024	2,242	52.44%	1,983	46.39%	50	1.17%
2018	1,837	60.13%	1,122	36.73%	96	3.14%
2012	1,904	57.52%	1,345	40.63%	61	1.84%
2006	1,642	60.43%	1,040	38.28%	35	1.29%

United States Senate election results for Mountainside2
Year	Republican		Democratic		Third party(ies)	
Year	No.	%	No.	%	No.	%
2020	2,373	52.79%	2,094	46.59%	28	0.62%
2014	1,187	60.84%	736	37.72%	28	1.44%
2013	992	60.60%	640	39.10%	5	0.31%
2008	2,142	61.15%	1,294	36.94%	67	1.91%

== Education ==
The Mountainside School District serves public school students in pre-kindergarten through eighth grade. As of the 2022–23 school year, the district, comprised of two schools, had an enrollment of 747 students and 71.6 classroom teachers (on an FTE basis), for a student–teacher ratio of 10.4:1. Schools in the district (with 2022–23 enrollment data from the National Center for Education Statistics) are Beechwood School with 269 students in grades PreK-2 and Deerfield School with 467 students in grades 3-8.

Public school students in ninth through twelfth grades attend Governor Livingston High School in Berkeley Heights, as part of a sending/receiving relationship with the Berkeley Heights Public Schools that is covered by an agreement that runs through the end of 2021–2022 school year. As of the 2022–23 school year, the high school had an enrollment of 936 students and 88.2 classroom teachers (on an FTE basis), for a student–teacher ratio of 10.6:1. Students also have the choice to attend the programs of the Union County Vocational Technical Schools, which serve students from across Union County.

== Emergency medical services ==
Emergency Medical Services for the borough of Mountainside is provided by the Mountainside Rescue Squad during nights and weekends. Since 2006, weekday daytime coverage has been provided by Atlantic Ambulance EMS, which has a paramedic unit stationed in Mountainside.

== Transportation ==
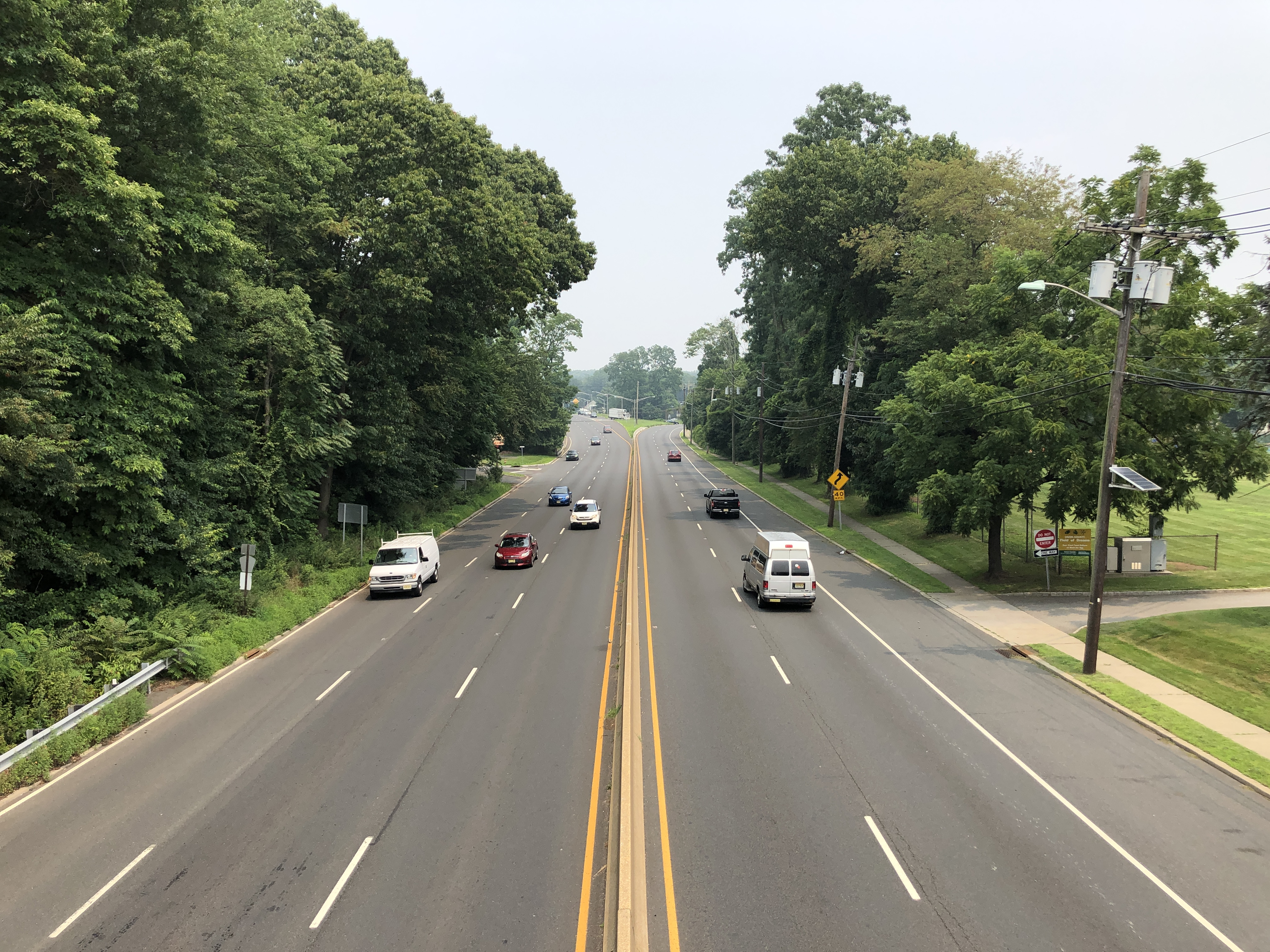
U.S. Route 22 in Mountainside

=== Roads and highways ===
As of May 2010, the borough had a total of 41.12 miles (66.18 km) of roadways, of which 29.74 miles (47.86 km) were maintained by the municipality, 8.75 miles (14.08 km) by Union County and 2.63 miles (4.23 km) by the New Jersey Department of Transportation.

U.S. Route 22 and Interstate 78 are the main highways running through Mountainside.

=== Public transportation ===
NJ Transit Bus Operations routes 114 and 117 provide service to the Port Authority Bus Terminal in Midtown Manhattan in New York City while routes 65 and 66 travel to Downtown Newark, all making local stops at points in proximate communities. An early use of bus rapid transit in New Jersey, a BBS (bus bypass shoulder, originally called a BOS or bus on shoulder lane) has been in operation for many years. Unlike most municipalities along Route 22, zoning in Mountainside does not allow for much commercial development adjacent to the freeway. For a one-mile stretch in the town, the eastbound shoulder on the arterial road can be used for peak hour buses. In 2012, the New Jersey Department of Transportation (NJDOT) regulated the BBS as an exclusive bus lane from 6 to 7:30am. In 2009, NJDOT funded construction of two bus turnouts along the road in nearby Union.

Newark Liberty International Airport is approximately 11 miles (18 km) east of Mountainside.

NJ Transit rail service is accessible via Summit station, and it has frequent direct service to New York Penn Station. The station is located around 2 miles (3.2 km) from the center of Mountainside, and Westfield station, which is about 4 miles (6.4 km) away, is also nearby.

== Notable people ==
People who were born in, residents of, or otherwise closely associated with Mountainside include:

- Erika Amato (born 1969), singer and actress who was a founding member of the band Velvet Chain
- John W. Campbell (1910–1971), science fiction writer who was editor of Astounding Science Fiction from 1937 until his death
- Bob Clotworthy (1931–2018), diver who won the bronze medal in the men's springboard event at the 1952 Summer Olympics in Helsinki and won the gold medal in Melbourne at the 1956 games
- Laurie Collyer (born 1967), film director, best known for Sherrybaby
- Angelo DeCarlo (1902–1973), member of the New York Genovese crime family
- Harry Devlin (born 1918), cartoonist for magazines such as Collier's Weekly
- Ina Golub (1938–2015), fiber artist who specialized in Judaica
- Charles J. Irwin (1930–2005), politician who served in the New Jersey General Assembly from the 9th at-large district from 1968 to 1971
- Bitty Schram (born 1968), actress who appeared on Monk and in the 1992 film A League of Their Own
- Dale Torborg (born 1971), conditioning coordinator for the Chicago White Sox and former professional wrestler best known for his time in World Championship Wrestling
- Jeff Torborg (born 1941), former Major League Baseball player and manager
- Hela Yungst (1950–2002), television entertainer and beauty pageant winner
