= Berkeley Heights Public Schools =

School district in Union County, New Jersey, US

Address
- 345 Plainfield Avenue Berkeley Heights, Union County, 07922; United States
- Coordinates: 40.677107°N 74.440046°W

District information
- Grades: K-12
- Superintendent: Kim Feltre
- Business administrator: Jennifer Nicholson
- Schools: 6

Students and staff
- Enrollment: 2,441 (as of 2023–24)
- Faculty: 225.3 FTEs
- Student–teacher ratio: 10.8:1

Other information
- District Factor Group: I
- Website: www.bhpsnj.org
Ind.	Per pupil	District spending	Rank (*)	K-12 average	%± vs. average
1A	Total Spending	$18,414	41	$18,891	−2.5%
1	Budgetary Cost	14,418	45	14,783	−2.5%
2	Classroom Instruction	8,978	57	8,763	2.5%
6	Support Services	2,110	40	2,392	−11.8%
8	Administrative Cost	1,468	28	1,485	−1.1%
10	Operations & Maintenance	1,300	11	1,783	−27.1%
13	Extracurricular Activities	530	59	268	97.8%
16	Median Teacher Salary	69,457	59	64,043
Data from NJDoE 2014 Taxpayers' Guide to Education Spending. *Of K-12 districts with 1,800-3,500 students. Lowest spending=1; Highest=68

The Berkeley Heights Public Schools are a comprehensive community public school district serving students in pre-Kindergarten through twelfth grade from Berkeley Heights in Union County, in the U.S. state of New Jersey.

As of the 2023–24 school year, the district, comprised of six schools, had an enrollment of 2,441 students and 225.3 classroom teachers (on an FTE basis), for a student–teacher ratio of 10.8:1.

The district's high school serves public school students of Berkeley Heights, along with approximately 300 students from the neighboring borough of Mountainside who are educated at the school as part of a sending/receiving relationship with the Mountainside School District. Governor Livingston provides programs for deaf, hard of hearing and cognitively-impaired students in the district and those who are enrolled from all over north-central New Jersey who attend on a tuition basis.

== History ==
Union County Regional High School District was established in 1937 as the first regional high school district in New Jersey, serving students from Berkeley Heights, Clark, Garwood, Kenilworth, Mountainside and Springfield. In November 1953, district voters approved a $1.95 million bond referendum that included funds to purchase a site in Berkeley Heights for a third high school. In April 1957, voters approved a $3.8 million bond referendum that included funds to construct a high school on the Berkeley Heights site. The name "Governor Livingston Regional High School" was chosen in September 1959, though there was criticism about potential confusion with Livingston High School located 10 miles (16 km) away in Livingston. In September 1960, the school opened its doors to 800 students from Berkeley Heights and Mountainside. The regional district's superintendent at the time was Dr. Warren Davis and Frederick Aho was the first principal of the high school.

In May 1996, the vote to de-regionalize the school district passed and the incoming freshmen in 1997–98 school year were the first to enter Governor Livingston High School, which became part of the Berkeley Heights School District.

The district had been classified by the New Jersey Department of Education as being in District Factor Group "I", the second-highest of eight groupings. District Factor Groups organize districts statewide to allow comparison by common socioeconomic characteristics of the local districts. From lowest socioeconomic status to highest, the categories are A, B, CD, DE, FG, GH, I and J.

== Schools ==
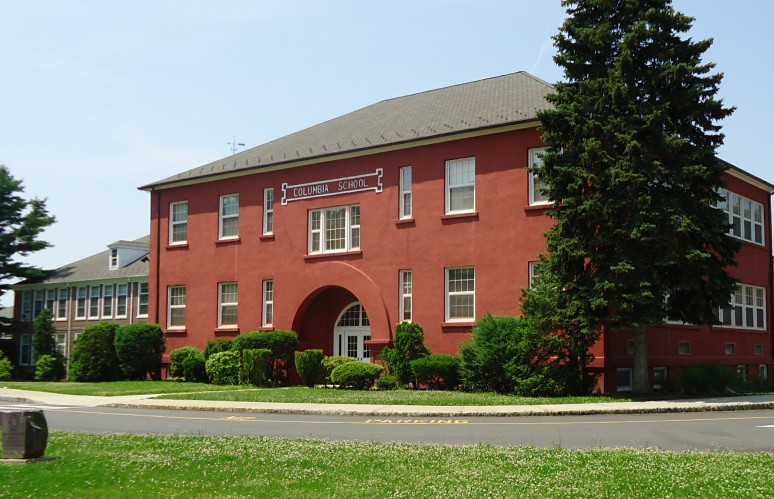
Columbia Middle School

Schools in the district (with 2023–24 enrollment data from the National Center for Education Statistics) are:

Elementary schools

- Mary Kay McMillin Early Childhood Center with 249 students in grades PreK–2
  - James Finley, principal
- William Woodruff Elementary School with 243 students in grades K–2
  - Brenda Marley, principal
- Thomas P. Hughes Elementary School with 270 students in grades 3–5
  - Chris Derflinger, principal
- Mountain Park Elementary School with 214 students in grades 3–5
  - Jon Morisseau, principal

Middle school

- Columbia Middle School with 536 students in grades 6–8
  - Paul Kobliska, principal

High school

- Governor Livingston High School with 920 students in grades 9–12
  - Robert Nixon, principal

== Administration ==
Core members of the district's administration are:

- Kim Feltre, superintendent
- Dan Gallagher, interim business administrator and board secretary

== Board of education ==
The district's board of education is comprised of seven members who set policy and oversee the fiscal and educational operation of the district through its administration. As a Type II school district, the board's trustees are elected directly by voters to serve three-year terms of office on a staggered basis, with three seats up for election each year held (since 2012) as part of the November general election; a representative appointed by Mountainside also sits on the board. The board appoints a superintendent to oversee the district's day-to-day operations and a business administrator to supervise the business functions of the district.

The board of education and administrative offices for the district are located in the original Columbia School building on Plainfield Avenue, adjacent to the middle school building.
