= Summit Health =

American medical practice

Coordinates: 40.677712°N 74.412122°W

Summit Health is a for-profit, multi-specialty medical practice headquartered in Berkeley Heights, New Jersey. The company was a result of a merger between Summit Medical Group and CityMD.

It is now owned by Walgreens-owned VillageMD.

Summit Health is led by Chairman and CEO Jeffrey Le Benger, MD. In 2016, Le Benger was named #8 in the "NJBiz Health Care Power 50 list" – a publicized ranking of the leaders of New Jersey healthcare organizations, state policymakers and legislators.

In January 2023, Walgreens-owned VillageMD completed the acquisition of Summit Health.

== History ==
=== Founders ===
Summit Health traces its beginnings to October 1919, when co-founders William H. Lawrence, MD, and Maynard G. Bensley, MD established the company as Summit Medical Group in Summit, New Jersey. The two had met in the United States Army's World War I Ambulance Company 33, which Lawrence had organized, and which was later headed by Bensley. Lawrence attained the rank of Major, and Bensley attained the rank of Captain, in their participation in the ambulance company. Lawrence was in charge of the unit for a year until he became ill in 1918, and Bensley then led it until it was disbanded a year later. The teamwork they experienced as army medical staff led them to try to replicate the idea in civilian life, and they founded the first team medicine practice in New Jersey in 1919. In 1931, they expanded into a group practice with a total of seven or eight doctors. While the original partnership "team" was known as Summit Health, the group practice was organized as the Lawrence-Bensley Medical Group, but eventually readopted the Summit name.

Lawrence enrolled in Columbia University's College of Physicians and Surgeons at the age of 15. He became a surgeon, founder of Overlook Hospital, and a resident of Murray Hill.

Bensley was originally from Hamburg, New York (born in Buffalo), the son of a local banker, George A. Bensley, and Margaret Woodruff. He attended the University of Michigan and the University of Buffalo, from which he received his medical degree in 1910. He started practicing medicine as a surgeon and general practitioner, but became an obstetrician in 1931. He lived in Summit and Maplewood, New Jersey. Bensley died on March 23, 1985, at the age of 95. His wife, Helen Flemer Plunkett, who performed a community medicine auxiliary role, died on July 5, 2007, at the age of 108. They were married in 1938.

=== Growth ===
In 1950, Lawrence and Bensley expanded to a second location at 120 Summit Avenue in Summit, New Jersey. In 2003, Summit Medical Group signed a lease for a 42-acre office complex in Berkeley Heights, New Jersey, that formerly housed the D&B Corporation.

In 2013, Summit Medical Group established the Summit Medical Group Foundation, a nonprofit organization operating in the segments of health promotion, medical research and medical education.

In 2014, Summit Medical Group launched a new management company, Summit Health Management (SHM). SHM offers consulting and management services to physician practices in the United States.

In 2019, Summit Medical Group merged with CityMD.

In 2021, the company was renamed Summit Health, and Summit Medical Group Foundation was subsequently renamed Summit Health Cares.

As of April 2022, Summit Health includes more than 200 satellite offices across northern New Jersey and New York.

In November 2022, Walgreens Boots Alliance's primary-care-center subsidiary, Village Practice Management agreed to buy Summit Health in a deal worth nearly $9 billion, including debt. The acquisition was completed in January 2023.

== Research and care management ==
- In 2002, Summit Health began a multi-year project to implement practice-wide electronic health records (EHR). By 2007, it was completely paperless.
- Summit Health developed a "Diabetes Live Well Program". In June 2008, the American Diabetes Association (ADA) awarded it an Education Recognition Certificate for the diabetes program
- In September 2009, Summit Health released "Coordination of Multidisciplinary Resources for Vaccination of Egg-allergic Individuals During an H1N1 (Novel) Influenza Pandemic," a study showing the benefits of H1N1 immunization and the safety of vaccines for egg-allergic patients.
- In January 2016, Health joined Trinity Health Accountable Care Organization (ACO). Trinity Health ACO is one of 21 ACOs selected to participate in the Next Generation ACO, under the Center for Medicare and Medicaid Innovation (CMMI), a division of the Centers for Medicare and Medicaid Services (CMS). This model builds on experience from the Pioneer ACO Model and the Medicare Shared Savings Programs and allows ACOs to assume higher levels of financial risk and reward.
- In March 2016, Summit Health joined forces with other health care organizations in the American Medical Group Foundation’s "Diabetes: Together 2 Goal®" campaign. The goal of this three-year campaign is to improve care and outcomes for patients with type 2 diabetes.
- Summit Health has participated in clinical research for allergy, asthma, diabetes, hypercholesterolemia, lupus, osteoporosis, rheumatoid arthritis, sinus disease and oncology. Its oncology trials include studies for breast cancer, colorectal cancer, leukemia, lung cancer, lymphoma, and prostate cancer.

== Locations ==
Among its 67, Summit Health has four main operational locations:

1. Berkeley Heights, New Jersey (headquarters)
2. Florham Park, New Jersey
3. Livingston, New Jersey
4. Westfield, New Jersey
5. Clifton, New Jersey

== Affiliations and partnerships ==
Summit Health has additional affiliations and partnerships with the following:

- Chilton Medical Center
- Clara Maass Medical Center
- Hackensack University Medical Center
- Hoboken University Medical Center
- Morristown Medical Center
- NewYork–Presbyterian Hospital
- Overlook Medical Center
- Robert Wood Johnson University Hospital
- Saint Barnabas Medical Center
- Robert Wood Johnson University Hospital
