= Mountainside School District =

School district in Union County, New Jersey, US

Address
- 1497 Woodacres Drive Mountainside, Union County, New Jersey, 07092; United States
- Coordinates: 40.672543°N 74.370185°W

District information
- Grades: PreK-8
- Superintendent: Janet Walling
- Business administrator: Dana Sullivan (interim)
- Schools: 2

Students and staff
- Enrollment: 747 (as of 2022–23)
- Faculty: 71.6 FTEs
- Student–teacher ratio: 10.4:1

Other information
- District Factor Group: I
- Website: www.mountainsideschools.org
Ind.	Per pupil	District spending	Rank (*)	K-8 average	%± vs. average
1A	Total Spending	$15,200	12	$18,891	−19.5%
1	Budgetary Cost	10,688	4	14,159	−24.5%
2	Classroom Instruction	6,464	3	8,659	−25.3%
6	Support Services	1,658	17	2,167	−23.5%
8	Administrative Cost	1,218	8	1,547	−21.3%
10	Operations & Maintenance	1,240	15	1,612	−23.1%
13	Extracurricular Activities	110	55	104	5.8%
16	Median Teacher Salary	58,511	25	61,136
Data from NJDoE 2014 Taxpayers' Guide to Education Spending. *Of K-8 districts with more than 750 students. Lowest spending=1; Highest=84

The Mountainside School District is a community public school district, that serves students in pre-kindergarten through eighth grade in the borough of Mountainside, in Union County, in the U.S. state of New Jersey.

As of the 2022–23 school year, the district, comprised of two schools, had an enrollment of 747 students and 71.6 classroom teachers (on an FTE basis), for a student–teacher ratio of 10.4:1.

The district is classified by the New Jersey Department of Education as being in District Factor Group "I", the second-highest of eight groupings. District Factor Groups organize districts statewide to allow comparison by common socioeconomic characteristics of the local districts. From lowest socioeconomic status to highest, the categories are A, B, CD, DE, FG, GH, I and J.

Public school students in ninth through twelfth grades attend Governor Livingston High School in Berkeley Heights, as part of a sending/receiving relationship with the Berkeley Heights Public Schools that is covered by an agreement that runs through the end of 2021–22 school year. As of the 2022–23 school year, the high school had an enrollment of 936 students and 88.2 classroom teachers (on an FTE basis), for a student–teacher ratio of 10.6:1. Students also have the choice to attend the programs of the Union County Vocational Technical Schools, which serve students from across Union County.

== Awards and recognition ==
In 2024, Deerfield school was one of 11 statewide that was recognized as a Blue Ribbon School of Excellence by the United States Department of Education.

== Schools ==
Schools in the district (with 2022–23 enrollment data from the National Center for Education Statistics) are:

- Beechwood School with 269 students in grades PreK-2
  - Jessica Vierschilling, principal
- Deerfield School with 467 students in grades 3-8
  - Suzanne Jenks, principal

== Administration ==
Core members of the district's administration are:

- Janet Walling, superintendent
- Dana Sullivan, interim business administrator and board secretary

== Board of education ==
The district's board of education is comprised of seven members who set policy and oversee the fiscal and educational operation of the district through its administration. As a Type II school district, the board's trustees are elected directly by voters to serve three-year terms of office on a staggered basis, with either two or three seats up for election each year held (since 2012) as part of the November general election. The board appoints a superintendent to oversee the district's day-to-day operations and a business administrator to supervise the business functions of the district.
