= Juliette Reilly =

American singer-songwriter and YouTuber

- Born: Columbus, Ohio, U.S.
- Origin: Berkeley Heights, New Jersey, U.S.
- Genres: Pop; country pop; folk pop; acoustic rock
- Occupations: Singer; songwriter; YouTuber; actress
- Years active: 2013–present
- Label: Two Tree Studios
- Website: juliettereilly.com
- Education: Muhlenberg College (BA)

YouTube information
- Channel: JulietteReilly
- Years active: 2013–present
- Subscribers: 169 thousand
- Views: 6.57 million
- Last updated: Apr 14, 2026

Juliette Reilly is an American singer-songwriter and YouTuber.

== Early life and education ==
Reilly was born in Columbus, Ohio to a Mr. and Mrs. Hayes A Reilly, and raised in Berkeley Heights, New Jersey. She graduated from Governor Livingston High School. In 2016, she graduated Phi Beta Kappa with a degree in music from Muhlenberg College.

== Career ==
Reilly has been writing songs since age 11 and she has been singing and performing since age 6. In 2015, she won the Grand award at the SongDoor Songwriting Contest for her song "Hero". Her music videos on YouTube have had more than 6.7 million views and her channel has 180,000 subscribers.

== Personal life ==
Reilly resided in Berkeley Heights, New Jersey.

== Discography ==
Battle Cry

EP by Juliette Reilly
- Released: June 5, 2016
- Recorded: 2015
- Length: 18:44
- Label: Two Tree Studios

I Am

EP by Juliette Reilly
- Released: December 31, 2016
- Recorded: 2016
- Length: 17:00
- Label: Two Tree Studios

My Virtual Escape (Original Soundtrack)

Soundtrack album by Juliette Reilly
- Released: July 6, 2018
- Recorded: 2017
- Length: 83:00
- Label: Two Tree Studios

LYGB (Love You Good Bye)

EP by Juliette Reilly
- Released: May 24, 2019
- Recorded: 2018
- Length: 21:00
- Label: Two Tree Studios

Albums

- Battle Cry (2016; Two Tree Records)
- I Am (2016; Two Tree Records)
- My Virtual Escape (2018; Two Tree Records)
- LYGB (Love You Good Bye) (2019; Two Tree Records)

Title	Chart	Peak position
"I Am"	US Heatseekers Albums (Billboard)	5
