= Jerry Ragonese =

American lacrosse player

Personal information
- Nationality: American
- Born: August 21, 1986 (age 39) Berkeley Heights, New Jersey, U.S.
- Height: 5 ft 10 in (178 cm)
- Weight: 200 lb (91 kg; 14 st 4 lb)

Sport
- Position: Faceoff specialist
- NCAA team: RIT (2010)
- MLL teams: Rochester Rattlers; Charlotte Hounds; New York Lizards
- PLL team Former teams: Redwoods Lacrosse Club; Redwoods Lacrosse Club
- NCAA team Former teams: RIT Tigers
- Pro career: 2011–

Jerry Ragonese (born August 21, 1986) is an American professional lacrosse player for the Chaos Lacrosse Club of the Premier Lacrosse League. He is from Berkeley Heights, New Jersey and went to Governor Livingston High School. He is a graduate of Rochester Institute of Technology where he played for the RIT Tigers. He also is a co-founder of the Faceoff Academy and Pro Athletics, a Los Angeles–based uniform and apparel manufacturer.

== Statistics ==
=== MLL ===
Season	Team	Regular season											Playoffs										
Season	Team	GP	G	2PG	A	Pts	Sh	GB	Pen	PIM	FOW	FOA	GP	G	2PG	A	Pts	Sh	GB	Pen	PIM	FOW	FOA
2011	Rochester Rattlers	3	0	0	0	0	0	3	0	0	14	40	–	–	–	–	–	–	–	–	–	–	–
2012	Charlotte Hounds	3	0	0	0	0	1	11	0	0	28	67	–	–	–	–	–	–	–	–	–	–	–
2014	New York Lizards	3	0	0	1	1	2	13	0	0	29	30	–	–	–	–	–	–	–	–	–	–	–
2015	New York Lizards	1	0	0	0	0	1	7	0	0	9	28	–	–	–	–	–	–	–	–	–	–	–
2016	New York Lizards	1	0	0	0	0	1	5	0	0	13	30	–	–	–	–	–	–	–	–	–	–	–
		11	0	0	1	1	5	39	0	0	93	195	0	0	0	0	0	0	0	0	0	0	0
Career total:		11	0	0	1	1	5	39	0	0	93	195											

GP–Games played; G–Goals; 2PG–2-point goals; A–Assists; Pts–Points; Sh–Shots; GB–Ground balls; Pen–Penalties; PIM–Penalty minutes; FOW–Faceoffs won; FOA–Faceoffs attempted

=== PLL ===
Season	Team	Regular season											Playoffs										
Season	Team	GP	G	2PG	A	Pts	Sh	GB	Pen	PIM	FOW	FOA	GP	G	2PG	A	Pts	Sh	GB	Pen	PIM	FOW	FOA
2019	Redwoods	1	0	0	0	0	0	0	0	0	6	20	–	–	–	–	–	–	–	–	–	–	–
2022	Chaos	1	1	0	0	1	1	2	0	0	2	8	–	–	–	–	–	–	–	–	–	–	–
		2	1	0	0	1	1	2	0	0	8	28	0	0	0	0	0	0	0	0	0	0	0
Career total:		2	1	0	0	1	1	2	0	0	8	28											

GP–Games played; G–Goals; 2PG–2-point goals; A–Assists; Pts–Points; Sh–Shots; GB–Ground balls; Pen–Penalties; PIM–Penalty minutes; FOW–Faceoffs won; FOA–Faceoffs attempted
