= Ina Golub =

American fiber artist (1938–2015)

Ina Golub, born Ina Joan Rudman (October 28, 1938, in Newark, New Jersey; died October 20, 2015, in New Jersey) was a fiber artist who specialized in Judaica.

== Life ==
Golub, the daughter of Frieda and Irving Rudman, grew up in Irvington and Newark, New Jersey, and graduated from Newark's Weequahic High School. She earned a bachelor's degree in art education from Montclair State University in 1960 and a master's degree in fine arts with a major in fiber arts and a minor in metal from Indiana University Bloomington in 1965. From 1960 to 1963, she taught at Kawameeh Junior High School in Union, New Jersey, where she met her husband Herbert Golub (1932-June 22, 2010), who was a music teacher at the school. They married in 1962. Herbert Golub was later a music professor at Kean College.

A resident of Mountainside, New Jersey, Golub died on October 20, 2015.

== Work ==
In 1965, Ina Golub began pursuing art full-time. Golub custom-designed fiber art, primarily Jewish ceremonial objects such as Torah mantles, wedding canopies, wall hangings, prayer shawls, as well as textiles with secular content for synagogues, museums and private collectors. She worked in tapestry, hand weaving, applique, quilting, stitchery, beadwork and fabric painting. Her first commission was the renovation of the ark at Temple Sharey Tefilo-Israel in South Orange, New Jersey. The Yeshiva University Museum mounted a 30-year retrospective on her work in 1996. Her work is in 40 synagogues throughout the United States, and in the permanent collections of the Yeshiva University Museum and the Jewish Museum.

== Awards ==
- Philip and Sylvia Spertus Judaica Prize (1998)
- Union County Fine Arts Award (2009)
