= CityMD =

American healthcare company

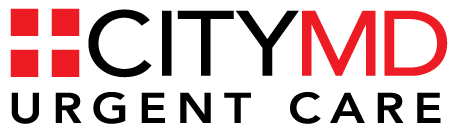

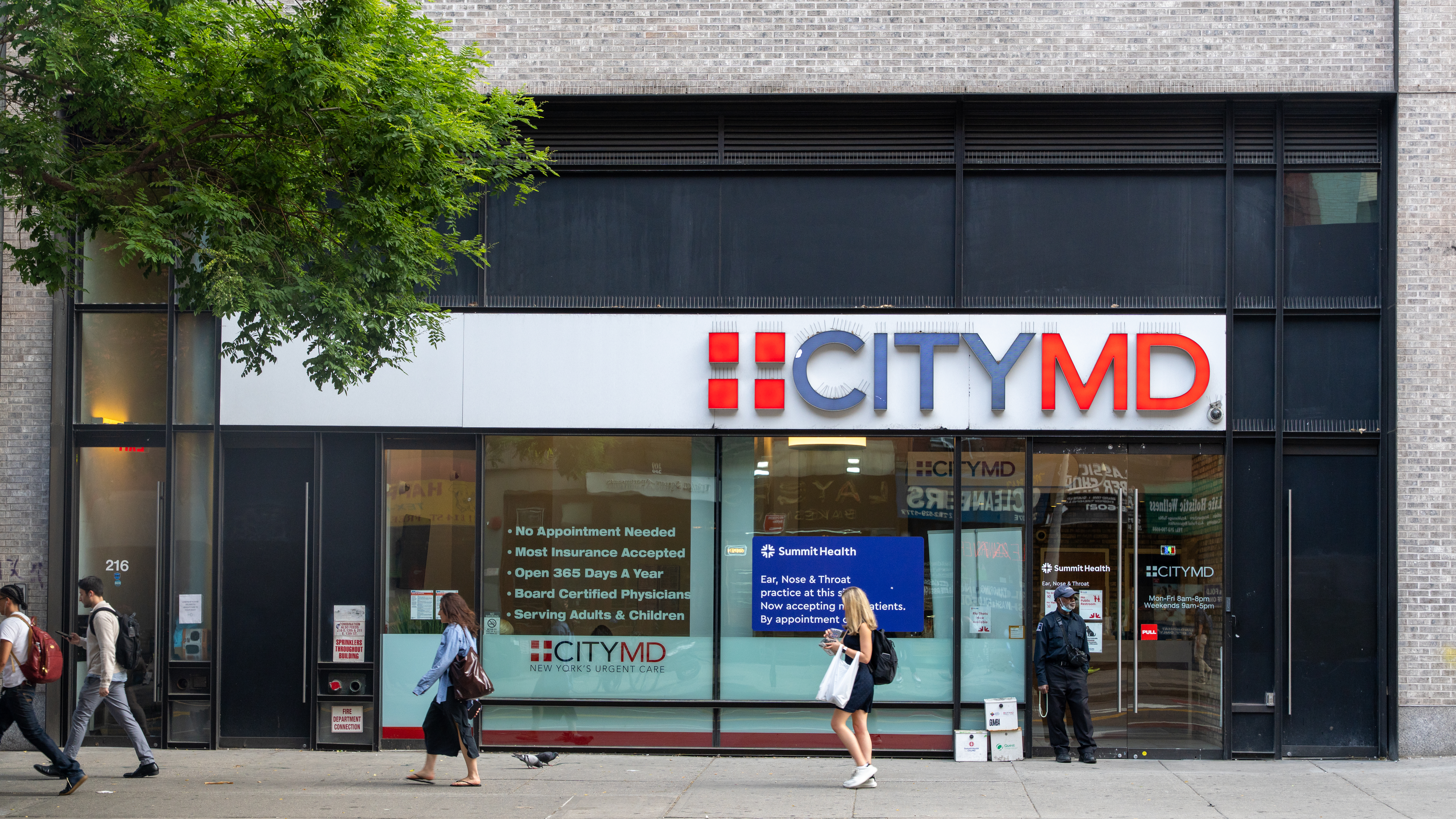
- Location in Manhattan
- Industry: Healthcare
- Founded: 2010
- Headquarters: New York, New York, United States
- Key people: Richard Park, M.D. (Founder & CEO)
- Products: Urgent care
- Website: www.citymd.com

CityMD is a healthcare company co-founded in 2010 by Rich Park and a group of 8 physicians. The company operates more than 150 urgent care centers in New Jersey and New York. It is the largest urgent care company in the New York metro area. CityMD employs over 700 physicians and mid-level practitioners. In 2017, Warburg Pincus acquired a majority stake in the company. On June 20, 2019, CityMD announced plans to merge with Summit Medical Group.

== Controversies ==
It was reported that in 2018, CityMD agreed to pay Medicare $6.6 million for billing fraud. They also paid New York state another $883,000 to settle false claims allegations.
