= Deserted Village (disambiguation) =

Deserted Village is another name for an Abandoned village.

It may also refer to:

- Feltville Historic District, an abandoned settlement in New Jersey known locally as Deserted Village
- The Deserted Village, a 1770 poem by Oliver Goldsmith
