= Lake Surprise (Watchung Reservation, New Jersey) =

Reservoir in Union County, New Jersey, U.S.

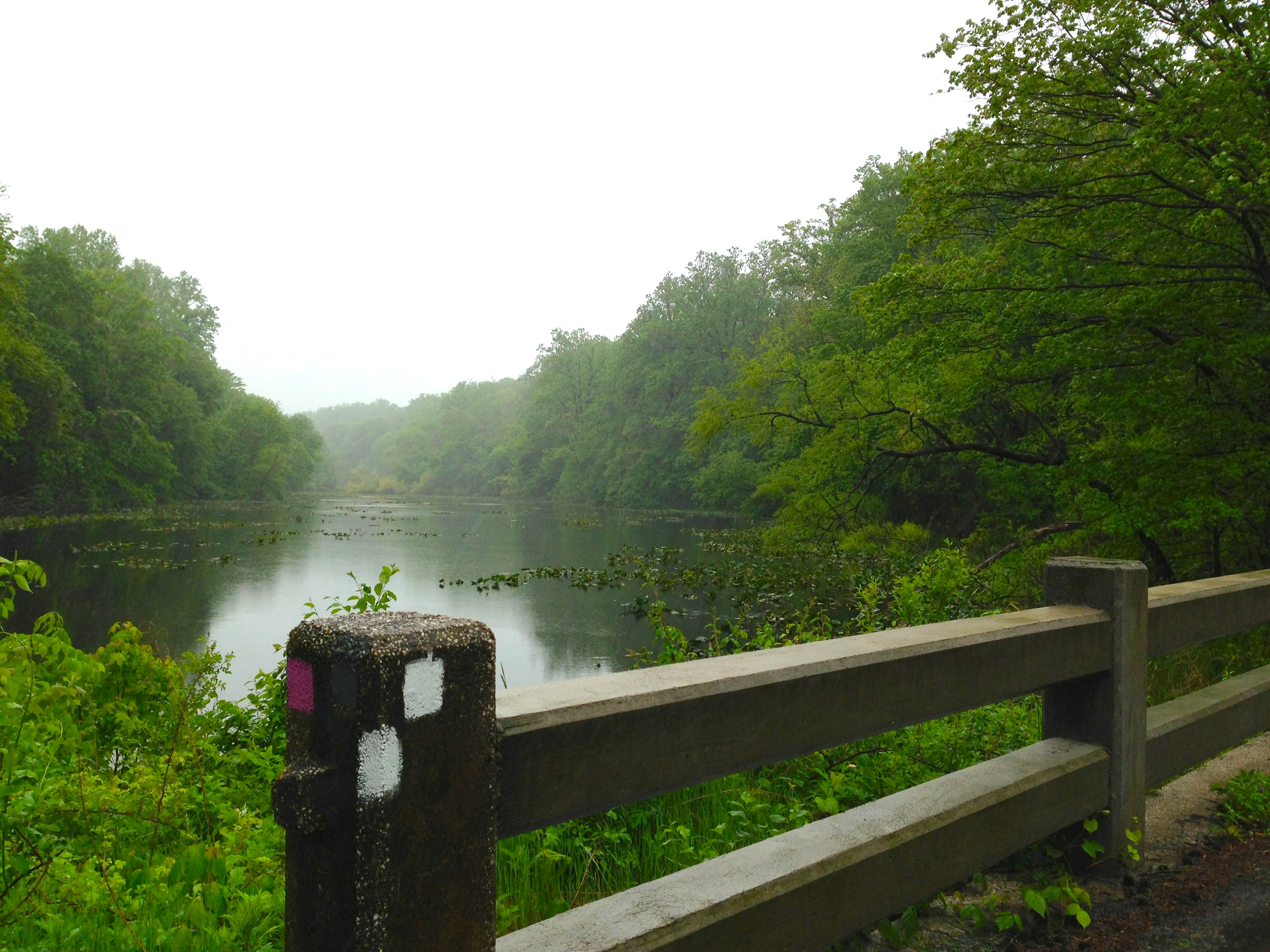

- Location within New Jersey Location within the United States
- Location: Berkeley Heights, New Jersey, Mountainside, New Jersey, United States
- Coordinates: 40°41′07″N 74°22′45″W
- Type: Reservoir
- Primary inflows: Blue Brook
- Primary outflows: Blue Brook
- Basin countries: United States
- Surface elevation: 269 ft (82 m)

Lake Surprise is a reservoir made by Surprise Lake Dam on the Blue Brook in Watchung Reservation. On the border of Berkeley Heights and Mountainside in Union County, New Jersey, the lake was created in 1845 for David Felt's papermill.

== History ==
In 1847 David Felt built a secondary water source for powering his mills at Feltville by damming the Blue Brook and creating Feltville Lake. The lake would later be renamed to Ackerman Lake after a summer resort at Glendside Park opened. Starting in the 1920s Union County started buying land, including the lake, for the Watchung Reservation with the County renaming the lake Lake Surprise.

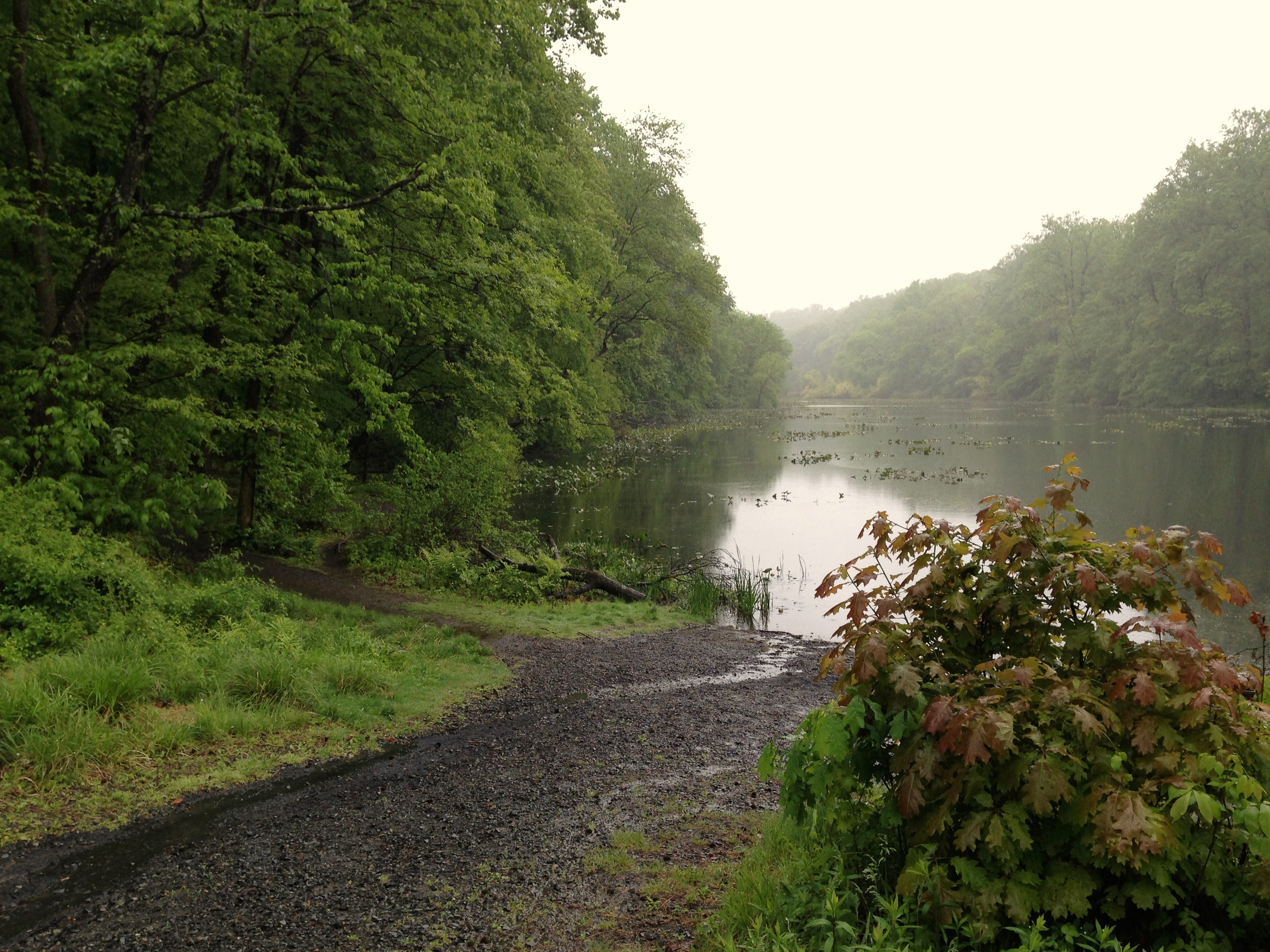
Lake Surprise Boat Launch
