= Blue Brook (Green Brook tributary) =

Tributary of Green Brook in New Jersey, U.S.

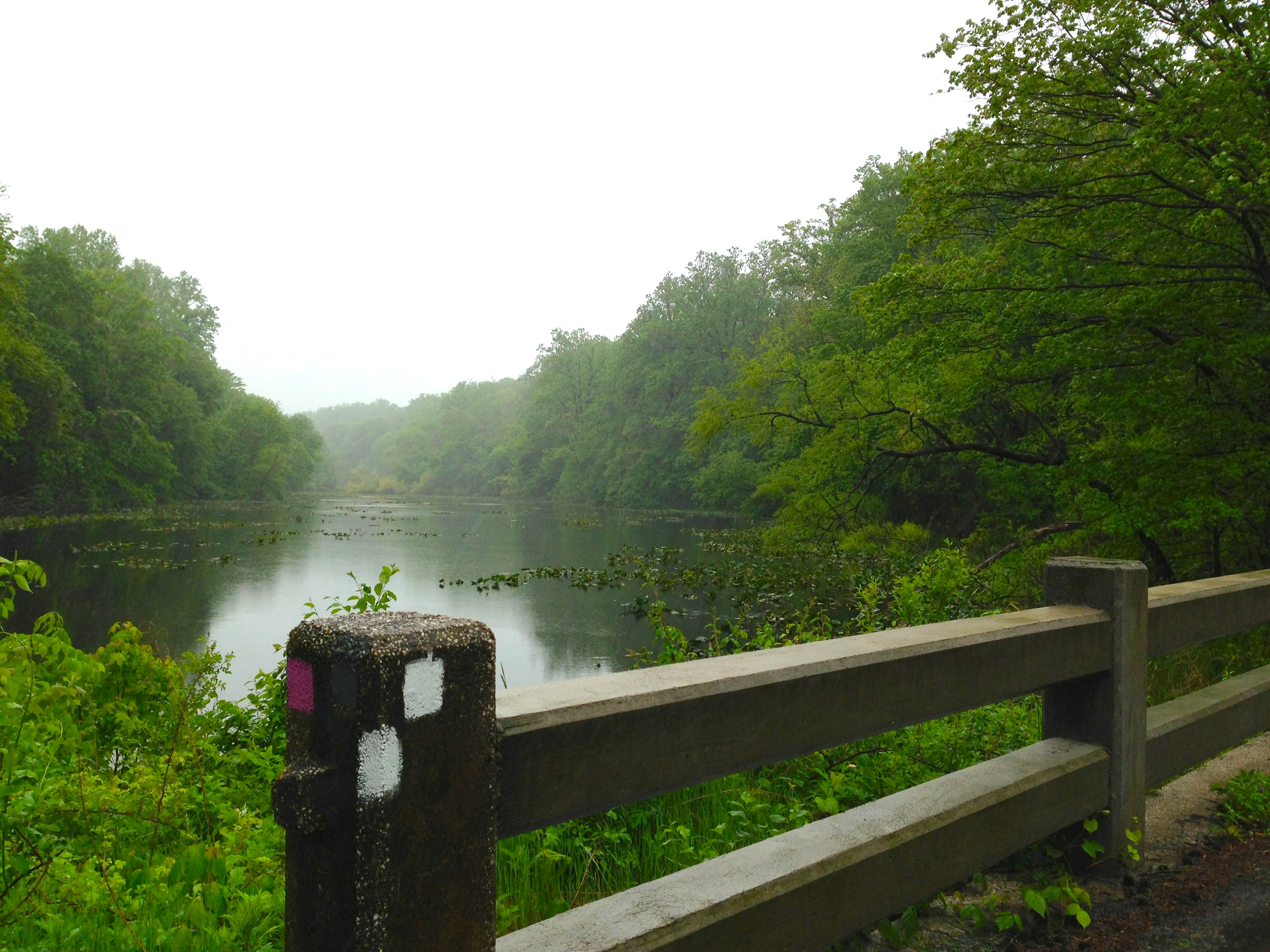
- Lake Surprise, viewed from WR Tracy Drive

Location
- Country: United States
- State: New Jersey
- County: Union

Physical characteristics
- Source: Summit, New Jersey
  - location: Summit, New Jersey
  - coordinates: 40°42′43″N 74°21′30″W
- Mouth: Green Brook
  - location: Berkeley Heights, New Jersey
  - coordinates: 40°39′59″N 74°24′12″W
  - elevation: 190 ft (58 m)

Blue Brook is a tributary of Green Brook in Union County, New Jersey, in the United States.

Blue Brook flows from Summit through Lake Surprise in the Watchung Reservation and terminating at Seeley's Pond near the corners of Diamond Hill Road and Valley Road where it joins Green Brook.

== See also ==
- List of rivers of New Jersey
