= Warinanco Park =

205-acre park in Roselle and Elizabeth, New Jersey, U.S.

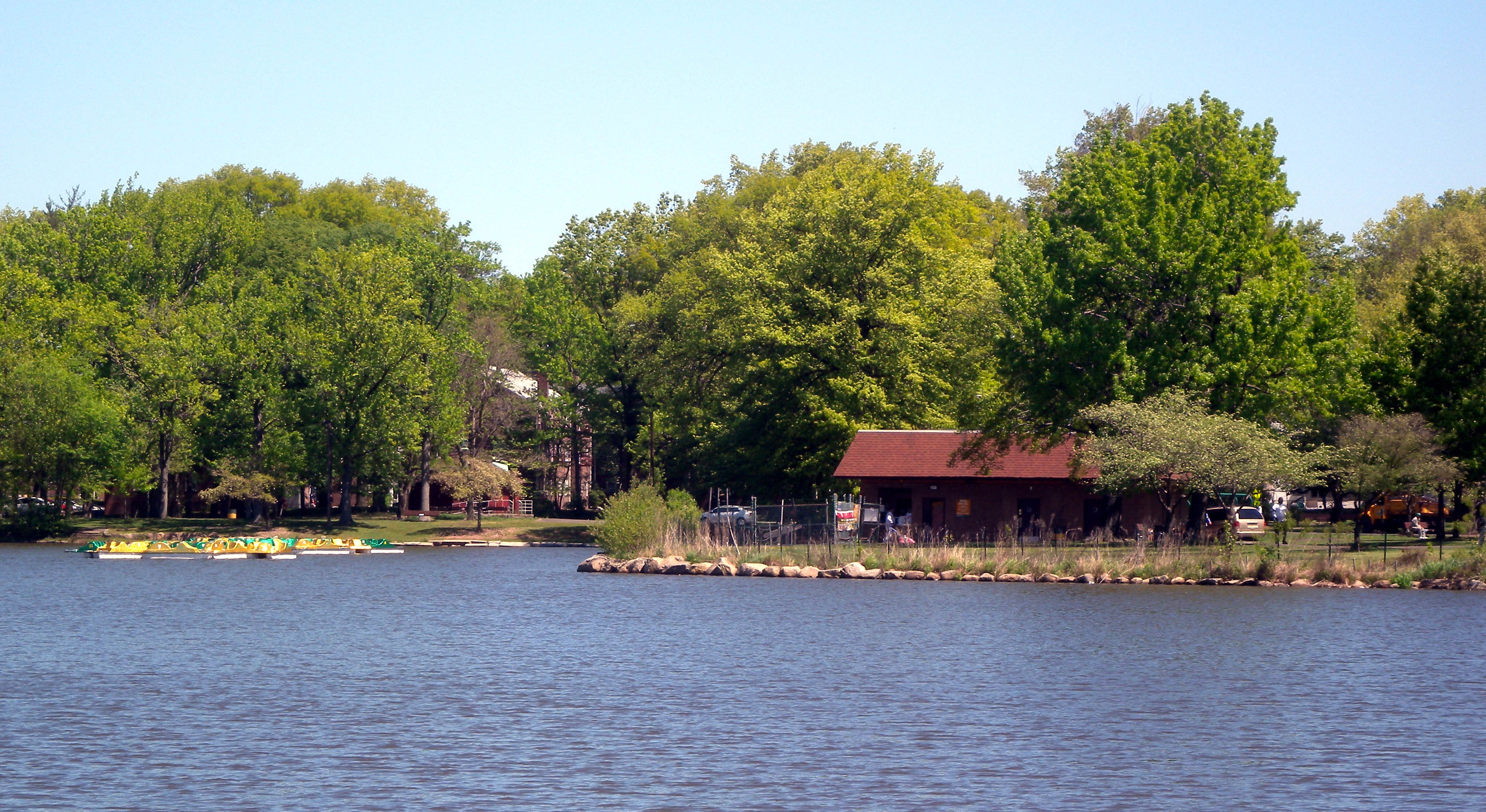
- Warinanco boathouse

- Location within Union County, New Jersey Location within New Jersey Location within the United States
- Type: County park
- Location: Roselle and Elizabeth, New Jersey
- Coordinates: 40.655507°N 74.240713°W
- Area: 205 acres (83 ha)
- Opened: 1925
- Designer: Olmsted Brothers
- Etymology: Lenape tribal leader "Warinanco"
- Operator: Union County Parks Commission
- Visitors: 50,000+ (in 2025)
- Open: Open year round
- Water: Warinanco Park Lake
- Collections: See list
- Parking: Free
- Public transit: Yes
- Facilities: Warinanco Park Sports Center
- Website: www.warinancopark.com

Warinanco Park (pronounced by locals as War-Rah-NINK-co) is a county park in Union County, New Jersey. It is 205 acres (83 ha) in size. It is located in Roselle at the border with the neighboring cities of Elizabeth and Linden.

== History ==
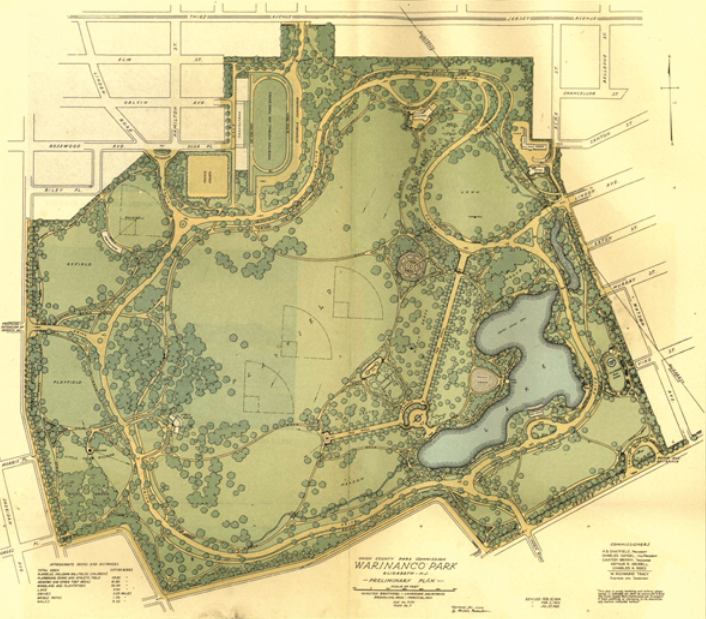
Original plan map

In 1921, a group of local citizens alarmed by the rapid industrialization of the area created the Union County Park Commission by referendum vote of the people, to purchase and preserve remaining natural areas.

In 1923, the famous landscape design firm, the Olmsted Brothers (founded by their father Frederick Law Olmsted who designed New York's Central Park) completed its design plans for "Elizabeth Park," now known as "Warinanco."

=== Lenape namesake ===
This park was named in 1925 for an indigenous Lenape tribal leader of the region, whose name was recorded by English colonists as "Warinanco" in 1664. That year, a group called the Elizabethtown Associates bought the Elizabethtown Tract including land in today's Union County from Warinanco and another Lenape leader, Mattano.

Warinanco's name is recorded elsewhere as "Waerhinnis Couwee," "Warrines" and "Wieronies." It is thought that Warinanco was a minor sachem, or tribal elder, of the Hackensack people (a band or subgroup among the Lenape).

== Features and landmarks ==
=== Azalea Garden ===
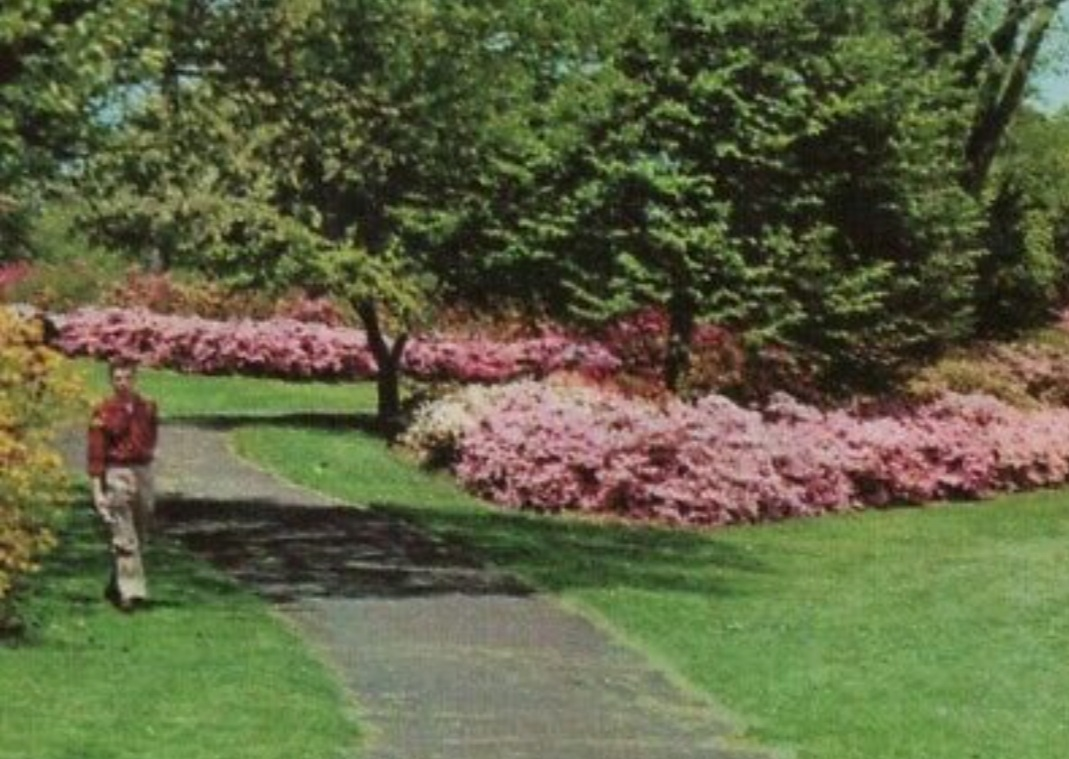
Warinanco Park's Azalea Garden many decades ago

The Caxton Brown Memorial Azalea Garden, located just south of the Warinanco Park Administration building. The garden is dedicated to the memory of Caxton Brown of Summit, New Jersey (1879-1952), who helped create, and was a member of, the Union County Park Commission. It contains hundreds of plants in many dozens of manicured beds. A boulder and plaque was dedicated in Brown's memory in the azalea garden in 1957.

The garden was refurbished with white gravel walking paths and new plantings in 2024.

=== Chatfield Garden ===
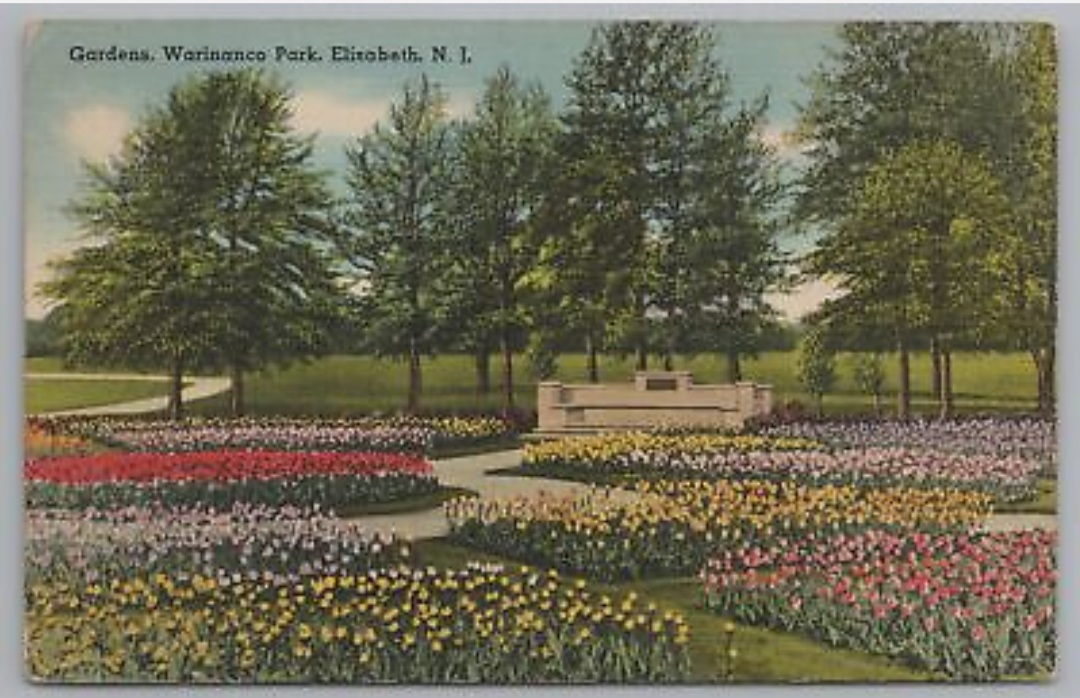
Chatfield Garden in Warinanco Park once featured an elaborate tulip display and is now geared towards more diverse blooms

The Henry S. Chatfield Memorial Garden (also known as the Chatfield Garden). This area originally contained 14,200 tulips imported from Holland and planted in 21 beds but has been transitioned to more diverse blooms beyond tulips to support pollinators throughout the season.

It is named for the Union County Park Commission's first president Henry Summers Chatfield (1864-1933), who is memorialized with a stone bench in the tulip garden.

=== Union County Park Commission Administration Buildings ===
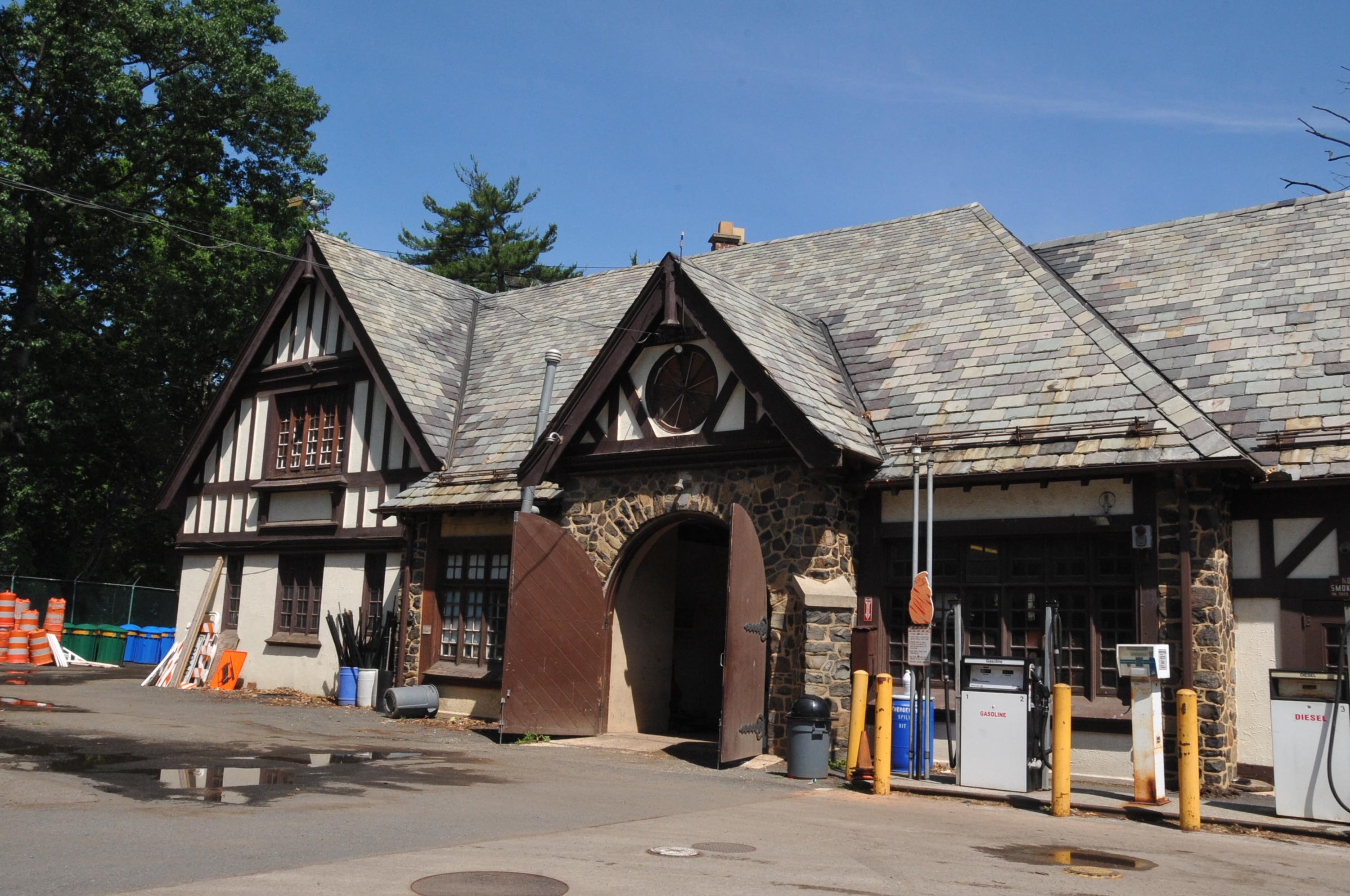
Union County Park Commission Administration Building, built 1925

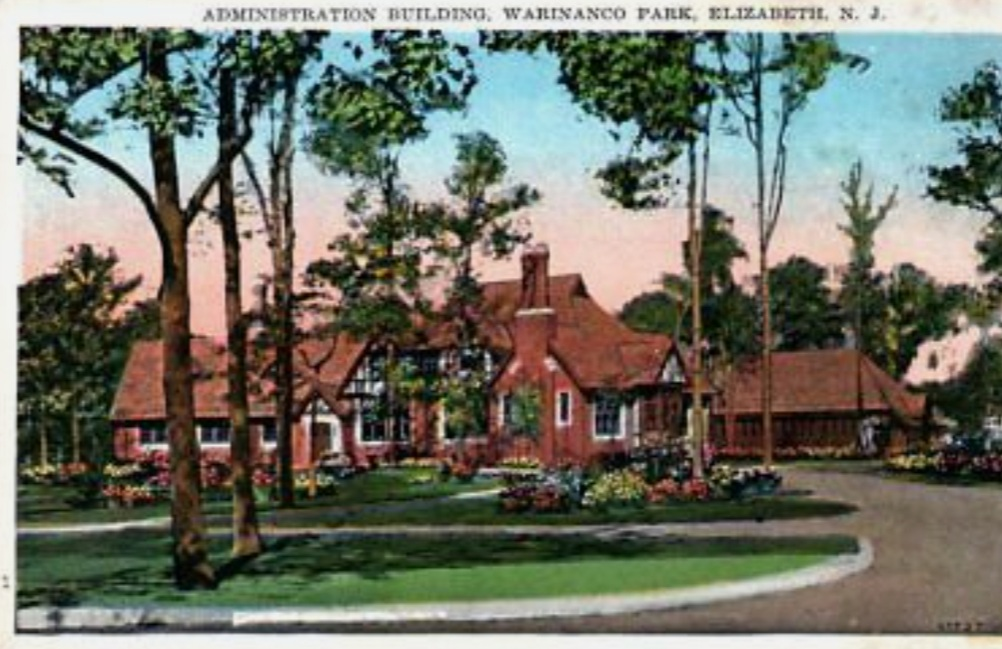
Administrative buildings in Warinanco

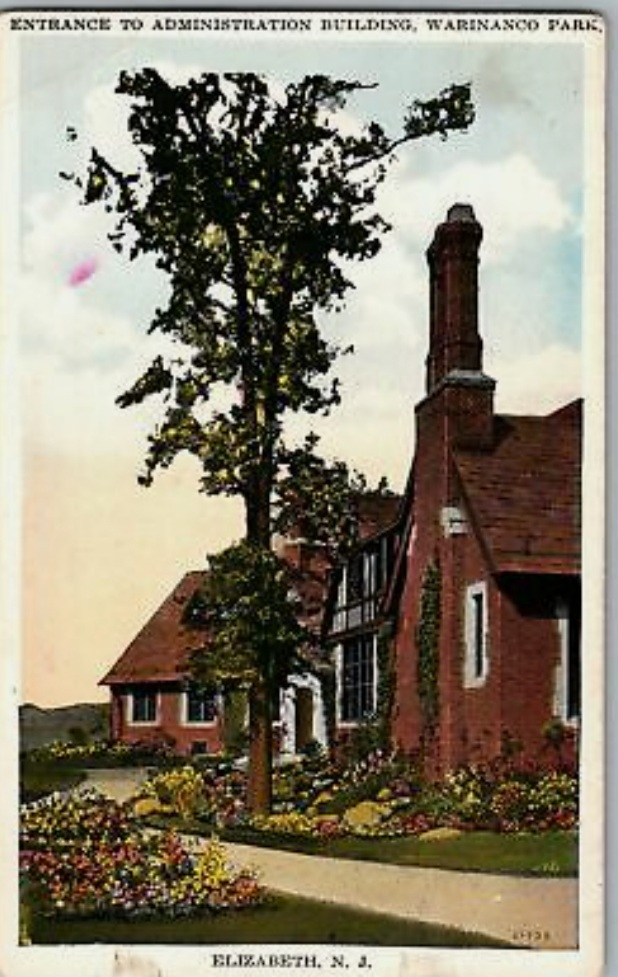
Entrance to Administrative Building in Warinanco Park

The Union County Park Commission Administration Buildings has several historical buildings located within the park. These buildings are listed on the state and the federal registers of historic places in 1985.

=== Sports ===
There is a 400-meter long athletic track as well as a long jump track and a space for shot put. Inside of the athletic track there is an artificial-surface field that can be used for soccer, football, and other sports.

The park has ten baseball diamonds.

=== Magnolia Grove ===
There is a mature planting of flowering magnolia trees.

=== Warinanco Lake ===
A dock offers paddleboating.

=== Warinanco Park Sports Center ===
The sports center, including the Warinanco Ice Rink, was expanded and modernized in 2017.

== Flora and fauna ==
Warinanco is known for its springtime displays of cherry blossom, dogwood, redbud, and azalea blooms. The display of Japanese cherry blossoms surrounding Warinanco Lake dates back to 1931, where Caxton Brown and his brother donated them to the park.

Trees include:

- Betula populifolia (gray birch)
- Fagus grandifolia (American beech)
- Juniperus virginiana (red cedar)
- Liquidambar styraciflua(sweetgum)
- Magnolia spp. (magnolia) planted
- Picea abies (Norway spruce)
- Pinus sp. (pine)
- Pinus strobus (white pine)
- Platanus occidentalis (American sycamore)
- Prunus spp. (cherry)
- Quercus alba (white oak)
- Quercus palustris (pin oak)
- Quercus rubra (red oak)
- Tsuga canadensis (eastern hemlock)
- Cercis canadensis (eastern redbud)

Shrubs include:

- Pieris sp. (andromeda) planted
- Rhododendron maximum (rosebay rhododendron) planted
- Rhododendron spp. (azalea)
- Taxus sp. (yew)

Herbs and flowers include:

- Artemisia vulgaris (common mugwort)
- Tulip (tulips) planted

== Arts and culture ==
The Roselle House Music Festival is an annual event, celebrating the gospel music-infused subgenre of house music native to the state of New Jersey first developed in the 1980s that is known as the "Jersey sound."

== See also ==
- Watchung Reservation
- Rahway River Parkway
