= Union County Park Commission Administration Buildings =

Coordinates: 40°39′31″N 74°14′17″W

- U.S. National Register of Historic Places
- New Jersey Register of Historic Places
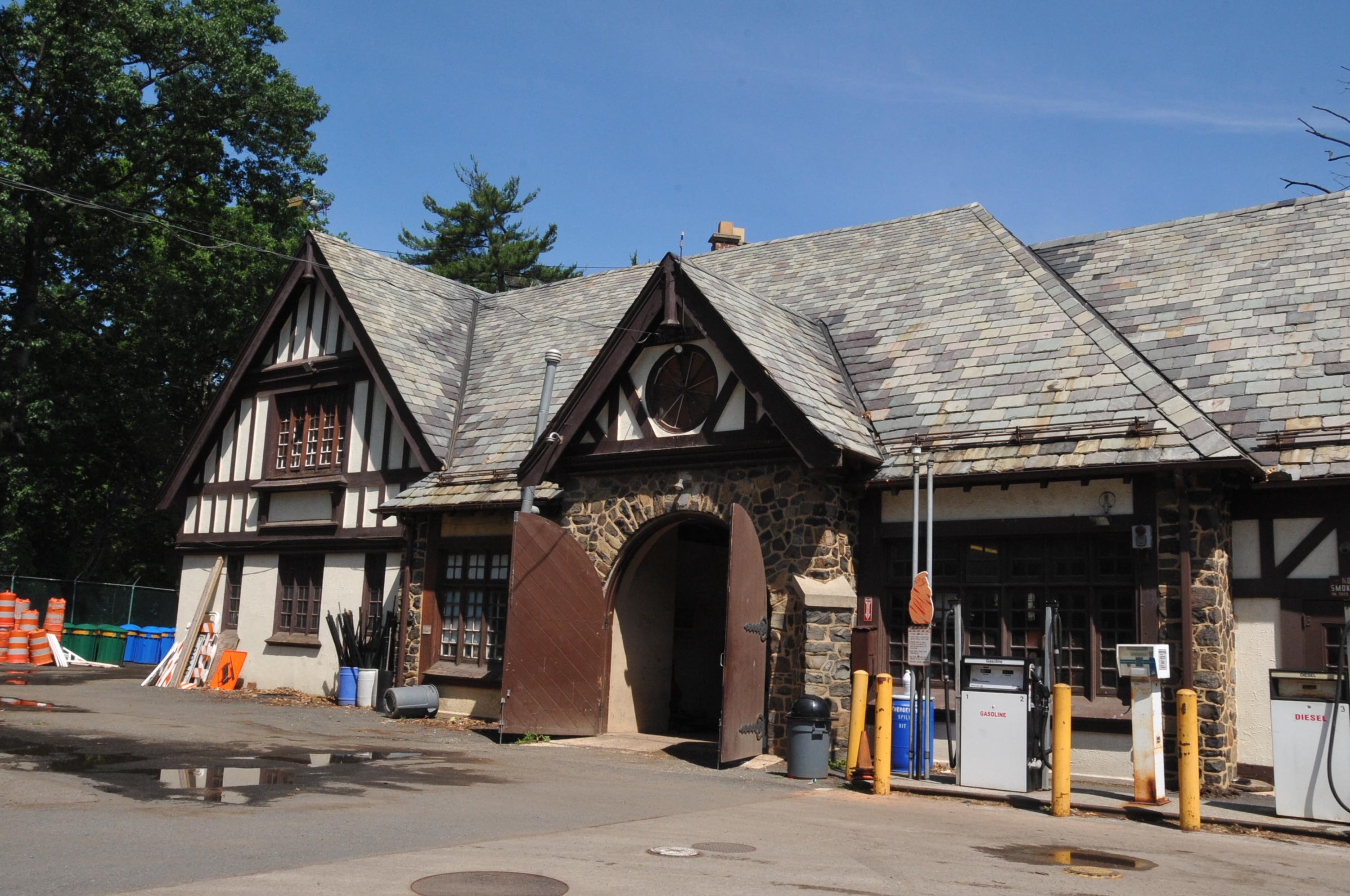

- Location within Union County, New Jersey Location within New Jersey Location within the United States
- Location: Acme & Canton Streets; Elizabeth; Union County; New Jersey USA
- Built: 1924/25
- Architectural style: Tudor Revival
- NRHP reference No.: 85002976
- NJRHP No.: 1512

Significant dates
- Added to NRHP: November 1985
- Designated NJRHP: October 1985

The Union County Park Commission Administration Buildings are located in Warinanco Park in Elizabeth, New Jersey. The Administration Building and the Service Building were built in 1924-1925 in the Tudor Revival style soon after the establishment of the commission. They were listed on the state (#2675) and the federal (# 85002976) registers of historic places in 1985.

In April 1921, Superior Court Justice James J. Bergen was petitioned to appoint a temporary committee to study the feasibility of a parks commission. On April 30, a temporary commission was named and given $10,000.00 and two years to complete the study. Within five months, the group finished the study and returned $8,391.00 of the funds. The emphasis of the report was to move quickly, before the available open space was gone. On the November 8, 1921, ballot, voters were asked to approve a permanent five-member Park Commission and $2.5 million to be spent at the commission's discretion.

The Union County Department of Parks and Recreation now comprises 36 parks that encompass nearly 6,200 acres, including Elizabeth River Parkway, Passaic River Parkway, Rahway River Parkway, Warinanco Park, and Watchung Reservation

== See also ==
- National Register of Historic Places listings in Union County, New Jersey
