= Watchung Reservation =

Largest nature reserve in Union County, New Jersey, US

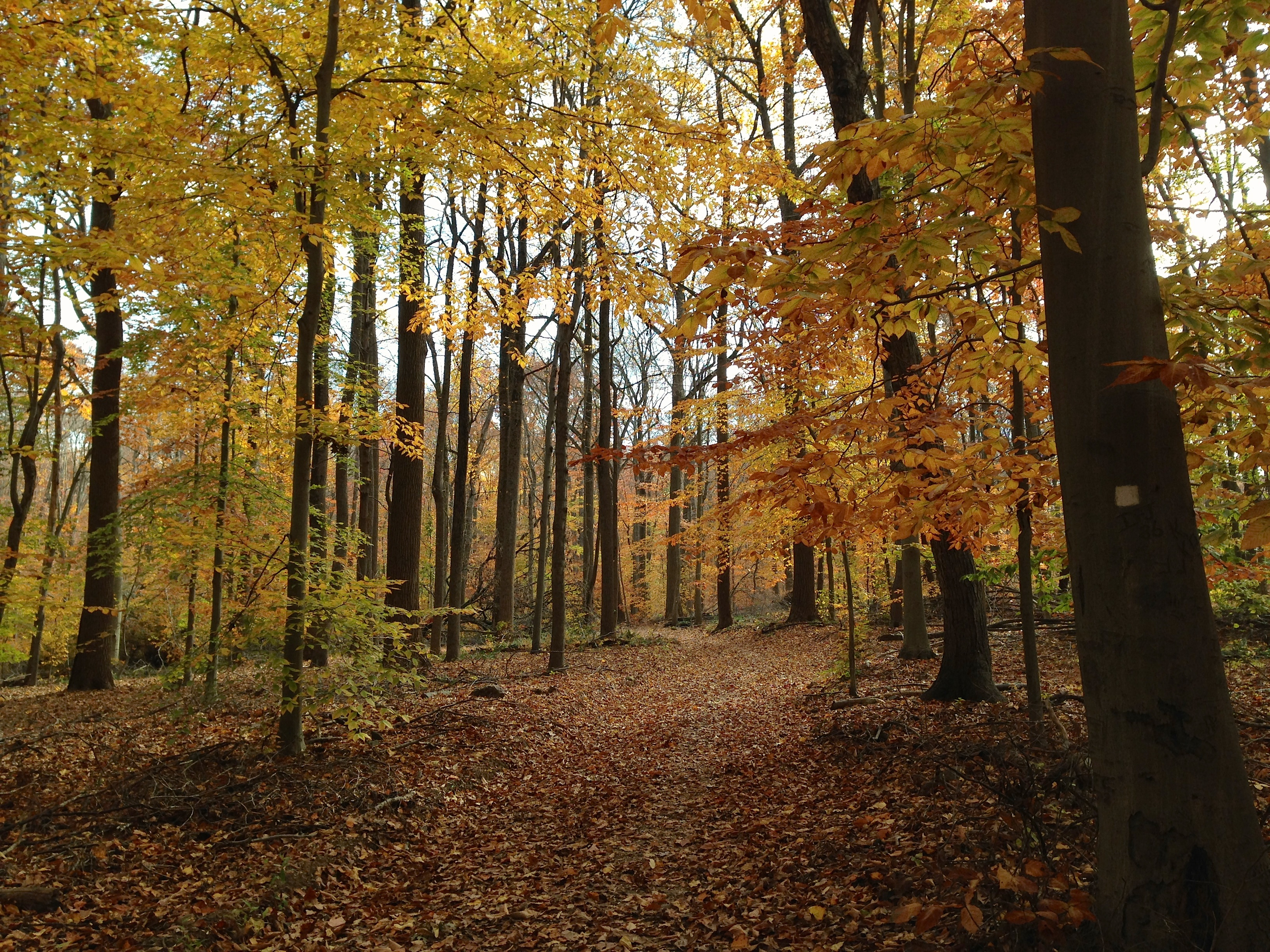
- Fall foliage along Watchung Reservation Sierra Trail

- Location within New Jersey
- Location: Union County, New Jersey
- Nearest city: Summit and Mountainside
- Coordinates: 40°41′11″N 74°22′24″W
- Area: 1,945 acres (7.87 km^{2})
- Elevation: 292 ft (89 m)
- Governing body: Union County Parks Department

Watchung Reservation is the largest nature reserve in Union County, New Jersey, United States. The reservation consists mainly of the upper valley of Blue Brook, between the ridges of the First and Second Watchung Mountains. A dam near the headwaters of the creek creates Lake Surprise.

The reservation covers an area of 1,945 acres (787 ha). Parts of the reservation lie within the city of Summit, the borough of Mountainside, and the townships of Berkeley Heights, Scotch Plains, and Springfield.

The network of trails in the reservation is popular with hikers and horseback riders. Cycling on the paths other than multi-use paved trails is not permitted.

== Geology and fossil record ==
The Blue Brook has carved a valley in the reservation between the 1st and 2nd Watchung Mountains along the strike of the less weathering-resistant red beds of the early Jurassic Feltville Formation.

The Feltville Formation is a mapped bedrock unit primarily in New Jersey named for the Deserted Village of Feltville in the reservation, which is near where its type section was described.

Red sandstone and shale beds of this formation crop out along stream level and along an old, abandoned mill race that follows the north side of the stream. On the south side of the stream are exposures of a highly fractured flow of the base of the Orange Mountain Basalt.

The best exposures of the red beds are along the abandoned mill race and along cut banks in the stream and its tributaries.

Paleontologist Paul E. Olsen uncovered ancient dinosaur fossils in the reservation in the 1970s.

The Ruth Canstein Yablonsky Self-Guided Geology Trail allows exploration of the geological features in the reservation.

== History ==
=== Lenape era ===
The original inhabitants of the Watchungs, the Lenape, referred to the mountains as the Wach Unks, or 'high hills'. Evidence of the Lenape presence in the Watchungs can be seen in numerous camp sites that have been uncovered, mainly along the rivers coursing through mountains and in the small caves abundant in the volcanic rock.

It is thought the Lenape favored the Watchungs for their profusion of natural resources, including abundant freshwater rivers and streams, a variety of forests, and plentiful fish and game. The Lenape may have also used crushed copper ore for tools and decoration.

The Mo-No-Pe-Nonck trail in the reservation was used by Lenape Indians a millennium ago.

=== European settlement ===
An abandoned copper mine exists in the reservation. Some believe exploration for copper in the reservation may date back to at least the 1600s. About 1736, a frontier settler named Peter Willcocks built a sawmill along the Blue Brook, clearing hundreds of acres of forest to meet the lumber demands of farmers on the frontier.

=== Deserted village ===
An entire village, Feltville, once existed in the woods in the northwestern quadrant. In 1845, David Felt built a printing factory along the brook. He eventually built a whole town on the bluff above the brook to support the mill operation. Around 175 people were living in Feltville by 1850. After Felt's retirement in 1860, other business ventures were tried but failed, and the town became deserted for a short time.

In 1882, Warren Ackerman bought the property and converted it to a summer resort, called Glenside Park, offering golf, boating, and horseback riding. When the popularity of mountain resorts ended as the Jersey Shore grew as a vacation destination thanks to the automobile, Glenside Park closed in 1916.

==== The Murals de la Selva ====
In 1916, the Deserted Village fell into decline upon the closure of Glenside Park. A local civil engineer and travel enthusiast named Edward J. Grassmann purchased a number of properties to serve as a club, which he eventually sold to the Union County Parks Commission. Grassmann was a lifelong Elizabeth resident who made his fortune in land surveying and kaolin processing; the trust that bears his name is still in existence today.

Grassmann decorated two of his structures at the Deserted Village to demonstrate his fondness for the Southwest and Latin America. He called one the "Mexican Cottage" and the other he christened as the "Indian Cottage."

It was Grassmann who apparently persuaded celebrated Nicaraguan/Mexican artist Roberto de la Selva to paint themed murals throughout the first floor interior of the Mexican Cottage. In the late 1920s, during his first trip to the United States, de la Selva spent months in rural Union County painting the murals, which depict native Mexicans at work, play and worship, including statues of both ancient gods and the Virgin Mary. As the only murals [that] de la Selva, who was primarily a sculptor, is known to have painted, these murals are significant to both the history of Feltville and the international art world.

Several years after they were painted, the murals were covered by wallpaper, which is how they remained for decades until uncovered in the 1970s. The location of the murals in the Deserted Village was named by Preservation New Jersey as one of the 10 Most Endangered Historic Sites in New Jersey.

=== The Union County Park System and the formation of the Reservation ===
Soon after the Union County Park System was formed in 1921, purchasing land to create the Rahway River Parkway to the east, this area was incorporated into the Watchung Reservation. The March 23, 1927, edition of The Westfield Leader describes the creation of new bridle trails in the young park.

=== Enchanted Forest and other apocryphal tales ===
Stories of paganism and witchcraft surround what is known as the Enchanted or Magic Forest in the reservation. The Enchanted Forest is a pine plantation of 16,000 trees placed in "endless, ruler-straight rows" by the New Deal-era Civilian Conservation Corps during the 1930s. The forest contains white spruce, red pine, and Norway spruce which are not native to the area; native trees replace the pines as they die. It has suffered heavily from pine beetle predation in recent years.

Other tales of hauntings and witchcraft abound in the reservation, as well as apocryphal tales of black magic and teenage devil worship. Some arose likely in relation to real-life teenage murder and suicide in the area, such as in nearby Houdaille Quarry (Jeannette DePalma). According to one true-crime writer, "Throughout the 1970s and up into the 2000s, there were reports of 'devil worship' in [Watchung Reservation]. There are police reports and newspaper accounts to back that up. So it was all going on in this hot spot of weird, paranormal activity." Some say 13 witches are buried beneath the stretch of road that runs from Watchung to Scotch Plains by the reservation.

== Recreation ==
While there are recreation areas within the reservation, much of the 1,945 acre (7.8 km^{2}) parcel is forested, and the reservation is managed for the preservation of its natural resources.

The most popular recreational activities in the reservation are hiking and horseback riding on its many trails.

Fishing, kayaking, and boating are permitted on Lake Surprise, Moxon Pond, and Seeley's Pond.

Biking on the hilly paved road through Watchung Reservation is popular; though biking on the trails is illegal.

Climbers within the state have been drawn to the bouldering opportunities on the cliffs along the brook and Diamond Hill Road at the Watchung's western boundary, although climbing is technically prohibited by the county.

=== Play ===
At the center is the Loop area, a large park with picnic tables and a play area called "The Loop Playground."

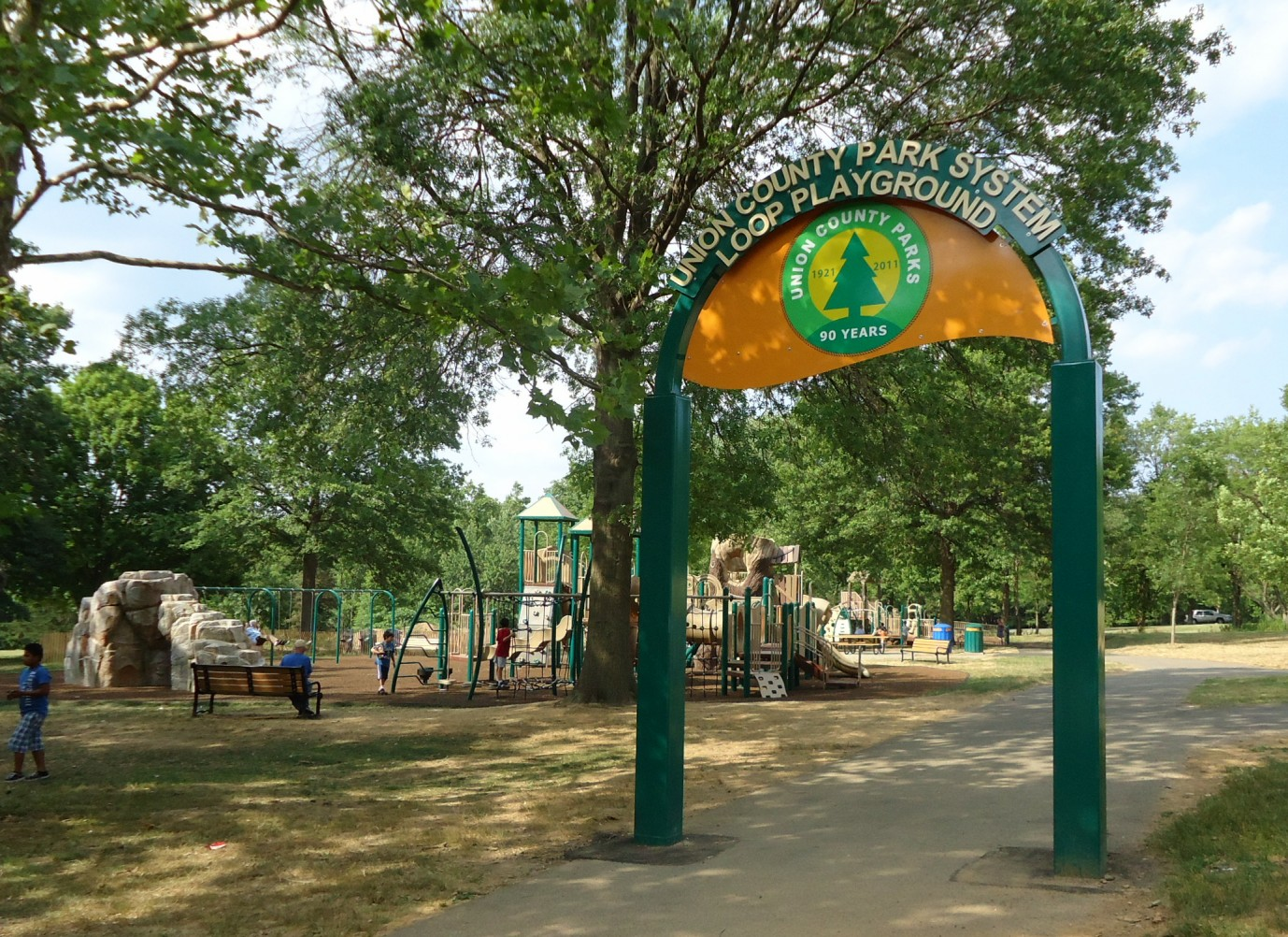
The Loop Playground entrance

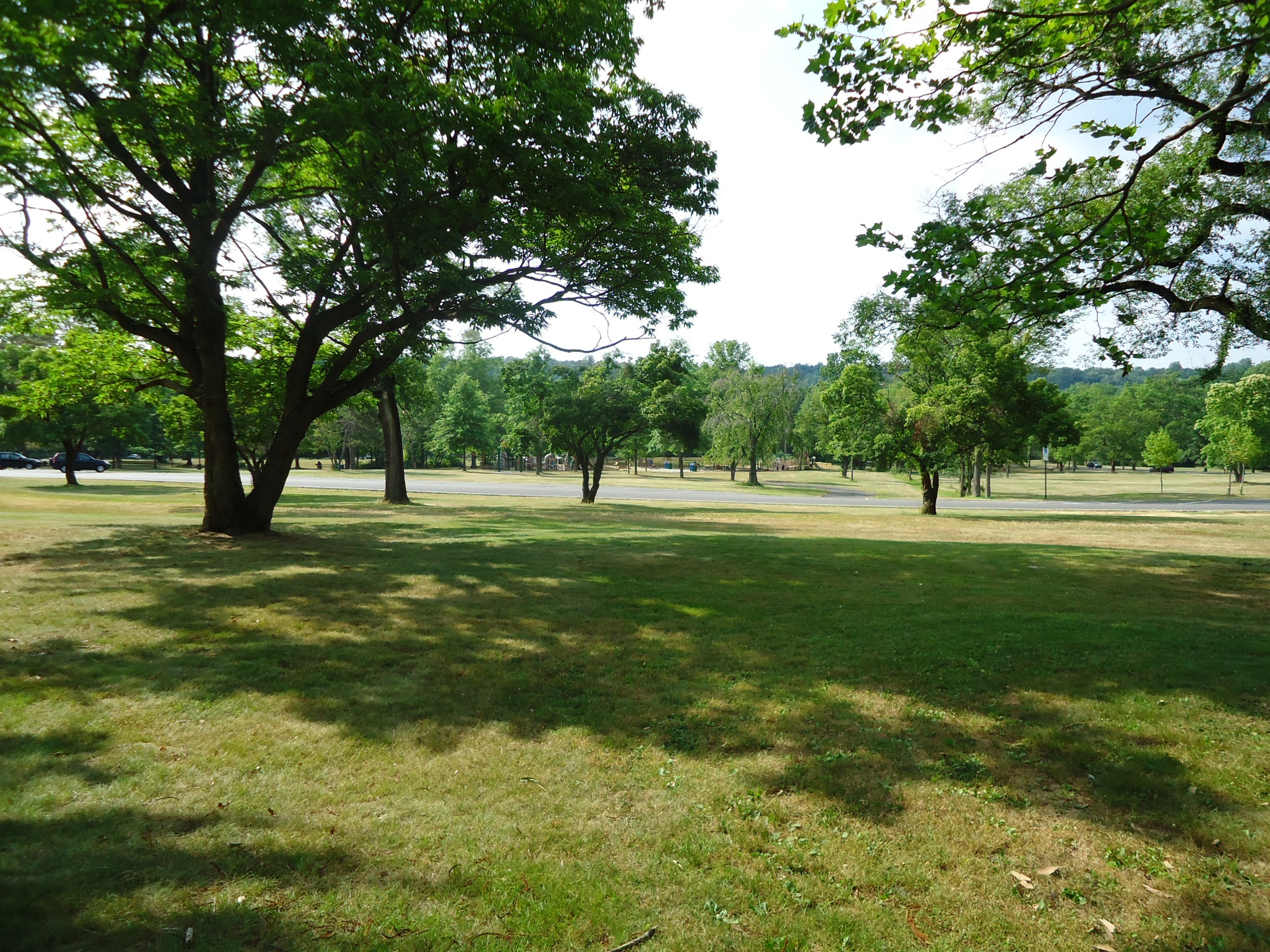
Fields near The Loop at Watchung Reservation

=== Trailside Nature & Science Center ===
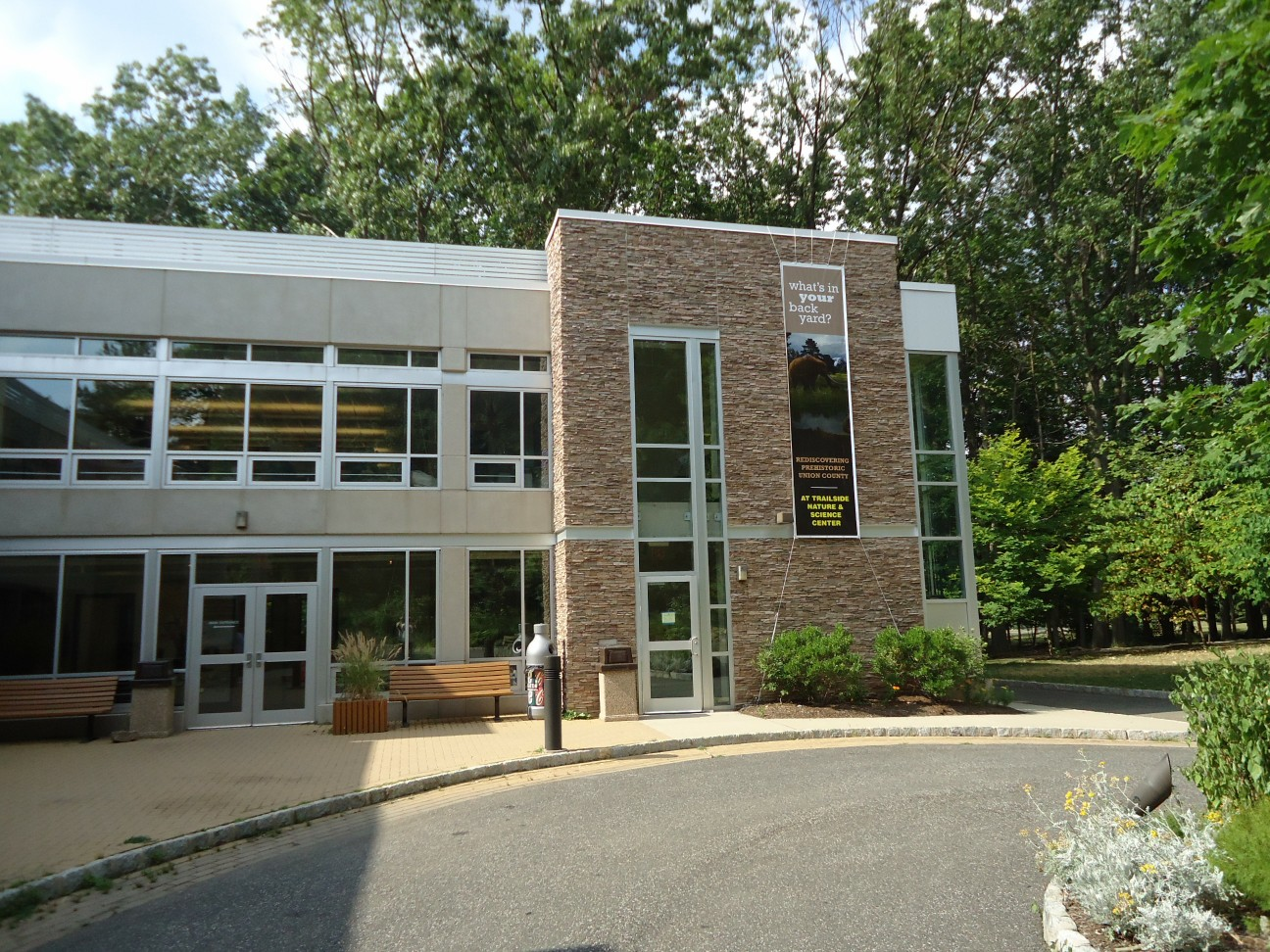
Trailside Nature & Science Center, exterior view

Built in 1941, the Trailside Nature & Science Center is at the southern edge of the reservation, along Coles Avenue in Mountainside. It is the oldest nature center in New Jersey. Admission is free. It features exhibits on local animals and plants, the geologic history of the area, and the Lenape Native Americans.

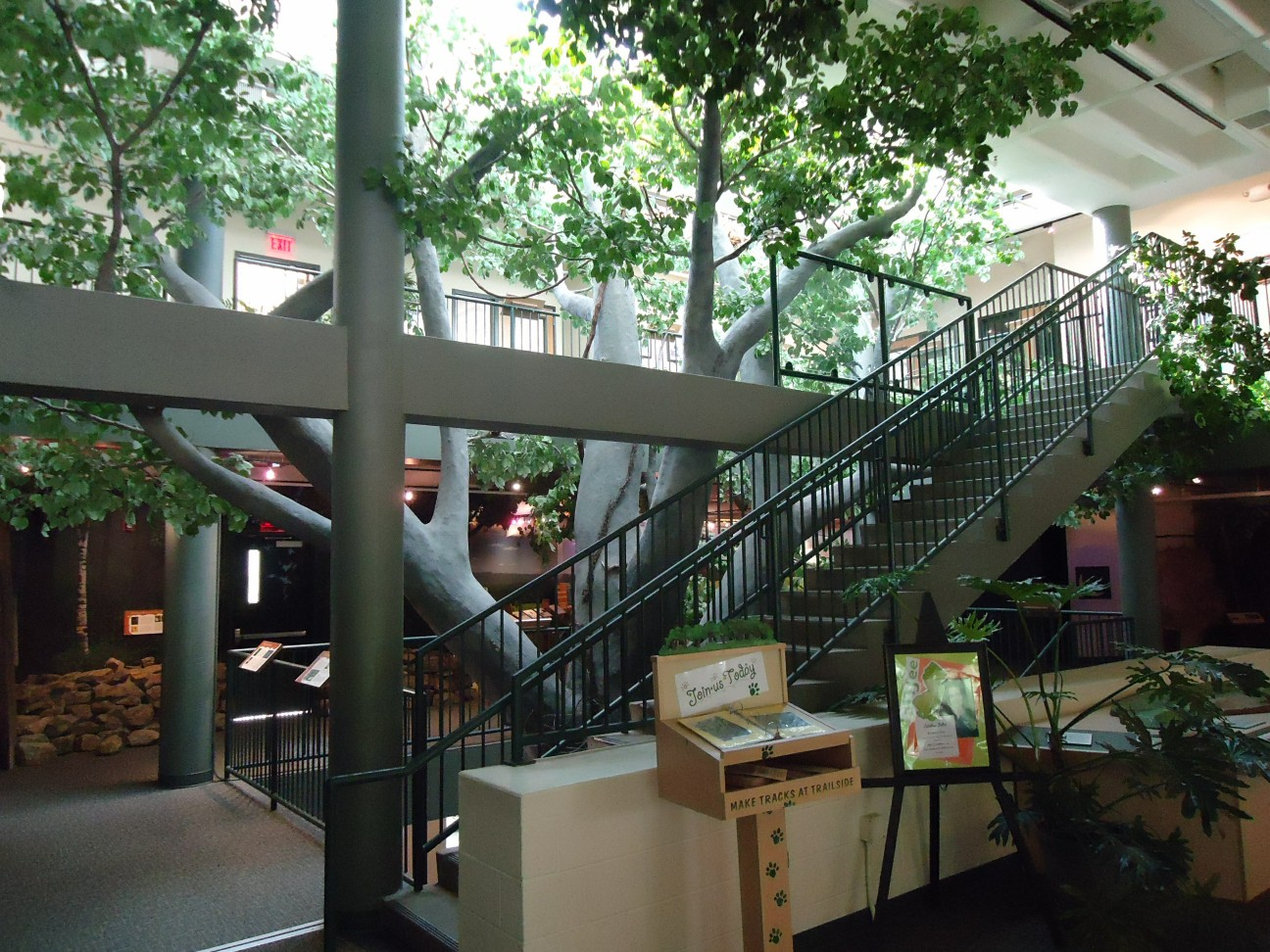
Trailside Nature & Science Center Watchung Reservation, interior view

=== Demonstration Gardens ===
The Rutgers Master Gardeners of Union County ("RMGUC") are volunteers who provide gardening, land stewardship and horticultural therapy services in Union County.

RMGUC is headquartered in the County building at 300 North Ave. East in Westfield. Their Demonstration Gardens in the Watchung Reservation next to Trailside Museum include various theme gardens, two flower-cutting gardens, the Berry Patch, herb and Harry Potter Gardens, and the Community Sharing Garden and Annex, where varieties of vegetables are cultivated for donation.

=== Watchung Stables ===
The county-owned Watchung Stables are located on a large cleared area in the eastern end of the park. The clearing was created in the late 1950s when, against strong local opposition, the U.S. Army built the Cold War defensive Nike missile base here. The preserve has 26 miles of equestrian trails.

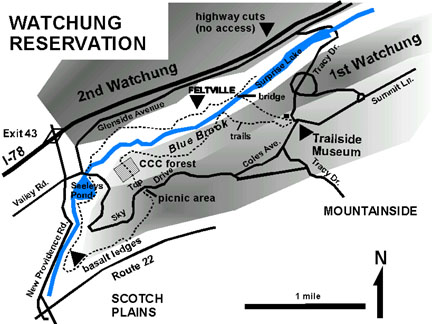
A U.S. Geological Survey map of the reservation

=== Hiking trails ===
The Watchung Reservation History Trail is a six-mile trail through various historical points in the reserve. It was designed and originally blazed by Rob Gruytch of Roselle Park.

In October 2017, the county issued a new interactive trail map for hikers to better navigate and to report trail problems.

== Ecology ==
Watchung Reservation, at ecological equilibrium, hosts mostly beech-maple-pine forest.

=== Native species ===
Common native plant species include:

- American beech
- Sugar maple
- White pine
- Black birch
- Spicebush
- Poison ivy

Common native animal species include:

- Painted turtle
- Northern cardinal
- Red-tailed hawk
- White-tailed deer
- Garter snake
- Grey squirrel

=== Invasive species ===
Because of its location in one of the most densely populated regions of the United States, various alien invasive species have become established in the reservation over the years. Common invasive plant species include:

- Multiflora rose
- Japanese barberry
- Japanese knotweed
- Garlic mustard

Common invasive animal species include:

- Red-eared slider (turtle)
- European starling (bird)

=== Extirpated or lost species ===
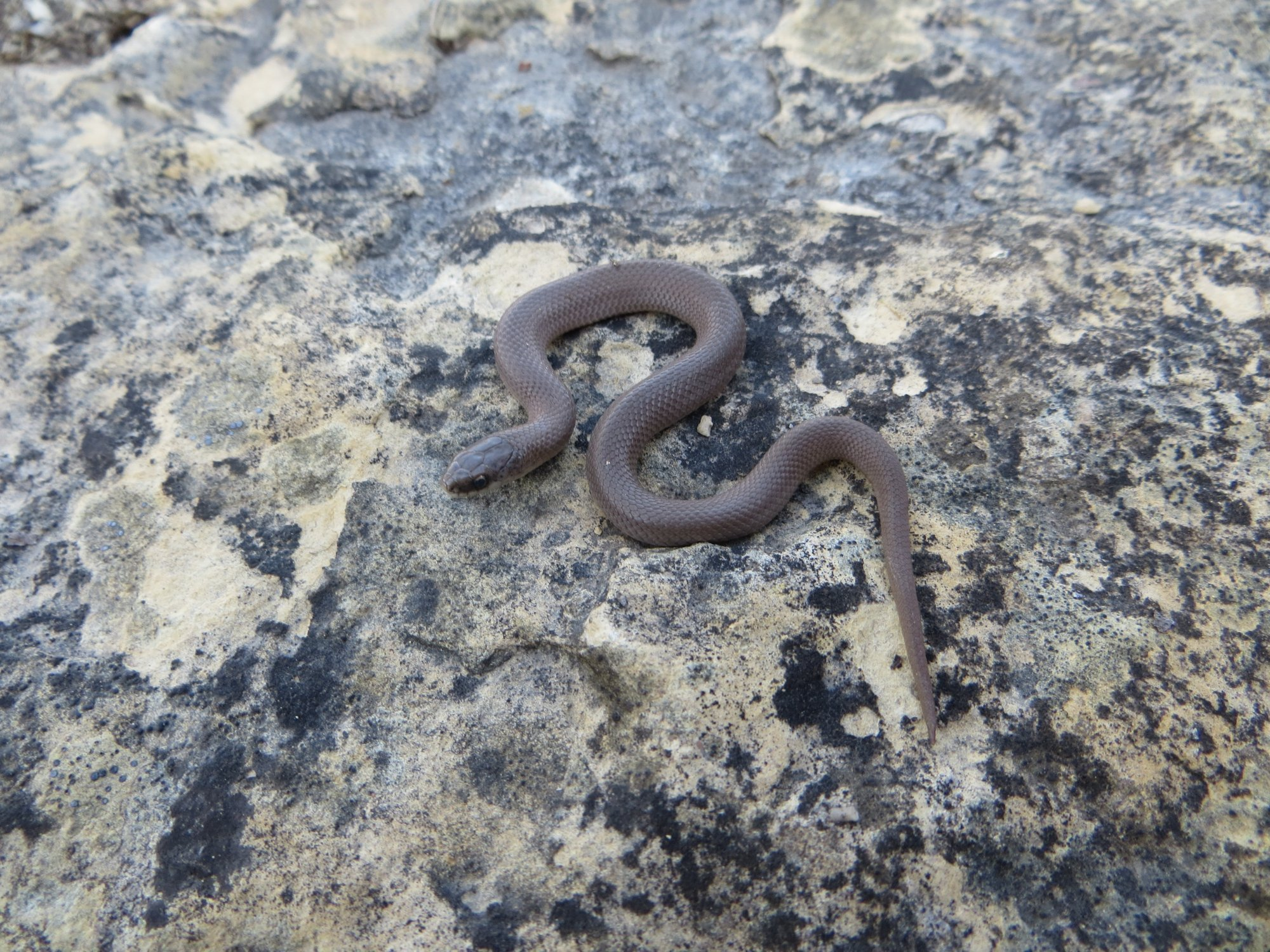
The smooth earth snake

Some native species used to live in the reservation but no longer can be found there, including:

- Smooth earth snake
- Bog turtle.
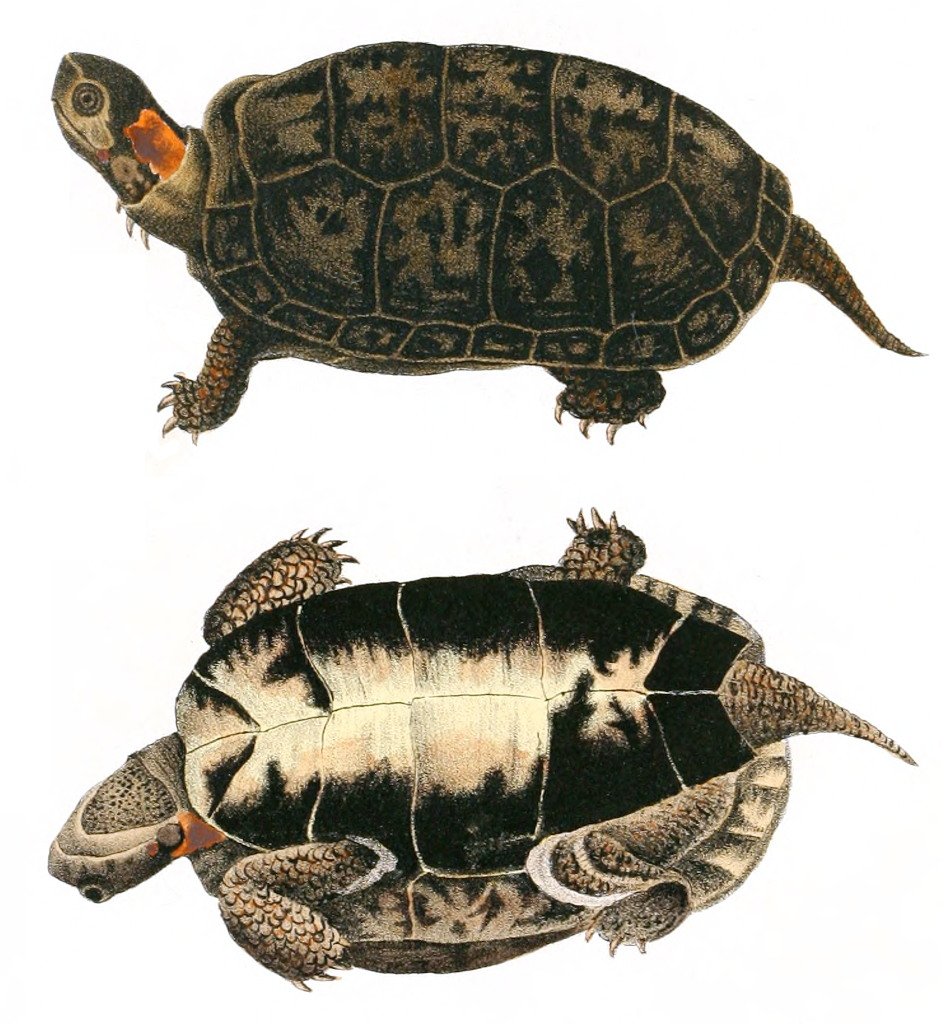
  The bog turtle
  The 1981 Green Brook Sub-basin Flood Control: Environmental Impact Statement said:

The bog turtle, Clemys muhlenbergi, has been classified as an endangered species in the State of New Jersey since the first state list of rare and endangered species appeared in 1971. There have been a number of sightings of the bog turtle in the Watchung Reservation in the vicinity of Lake Surprise. Potential bog turtle habitat also exists in the Blue Brook Valley.

Research by Zappalorti suggested that the bog turtle had been extirpated from the reservation due to habitat degradation.

=== Endangered blue spotted salamander ===
The Army Corps of Engineers wrote in 1981:

Blue Spotted Salamander, Ambystoma leterale, classified as an endangered species by the State of New Jersey has been recorded as having occurred in the Watchung Reservation (U.S. Fish & Wildlife Service, 1977). There is some uncertainty as to whether the Blue Spotted Salamander still exists in the reservation. Baird (1955) did not report finding any during his survey. Zappalorti (1978) also did not find any, but reports sightings in 1979.

=== Unique natural springs and salamander habitat ===
In its 1981 environmental impact report on a flood control project, Army Corps of Engineers discussed the unique natural spring environment in the reservation, which provided habitat for six species of salamander:

Scattered along the northwest slopes above Blue Brook in the Watchung Reservation, from the "Glen" to Seeley's Pond, are numerous springs that are of apparent great antiquity.

The springs in the reservation are the only series of intact and relatively undisturbed springs remaining in the area, others having been destroyed, disturbed or altered in some way by human activities.

Most springs will have one to three species of salamanders (Dusky, Two-lined, Red) that carry out their entire life cycles in the vicinity of the spring. The addition of any others indicates very long periods of stability. The Four-toed salamander is a rare relictual species, the presence of which makes these springs unique. The Long-tailed salamander is an even greater indicator of long term stability since it utilizes the underground portions of the springs as well as the surface portions. It also adds uniqueness to these springs since the reservation is the only place outside the Kittatinny Ridge and Valley of Sussex County where populations are known to occur at present.

No other system of springs in New Jersey appears to contain all five of the salamander species found in the reservation.

There have also been reports of sightings of the Blue-spotted salamander in the springs of Watchung Reservation.

== Safety concerns ==
In 2024 a car accident occurred on Sky Top drive within the Watchung Reservation. There have been questions whether the roads within the Watchung Reservation are safe.

== Environmental concerns ==
=== Governmental land takings ===
In spite of heavy local public protest, higher levels of government have taken land in the reservation twice for their own purposes. The first time was in the late 1950s when the U.S. Army built a Nike missile base and operated it between 1957 and 1963 to defend the airways over New York City. Today, the site has been redeveloped for use as Watchung Stables.

A more lasting effect on the reservation came in the 1980s when, following years of litigation and public activism, the New Jersey Department of Transportation won approval to build I-78 through the northern fringe of the reservation. Wildlife crossings designed to allow wildlife to travel safely between the severed parts of the Watchung Reservation were built.

=== 2017 mountain biking controversy ===
In 2017, local controversy erupted over efforts to introduce mountain biking in the Reservation by mountain biking enthusiasts, including Princeton-based Jersey Off Road Bicycle Association (JORBA).

The Sierra Club, other environmentalists, and hikers stated that the county had failed to behave transparently in working with a group of cyclists and bicycle store owners in pushing a plan to build 13.5 new miles of bike-only trail in untouched forest in the reservation. They pointed out that no environmental impact studies had been performed on the reservation itself, that hiking advocates like the New York–New Jersey Trail Conference (NYNJTC) had not been consulted, that no attention had been paid to the Olmsted landscape architectural legacy of the reserve, and that the county had gone straight to hiring an engineering consultant firm, Parlin-based CME Associates, to draft a master plan to construct the bike-only trails.

== See also ==
- Warinanco Park in Roselle
- Rahway River Parkway
- Union County Park Commission Administration Buildings
- Passaic River Parkway

== Photos ==
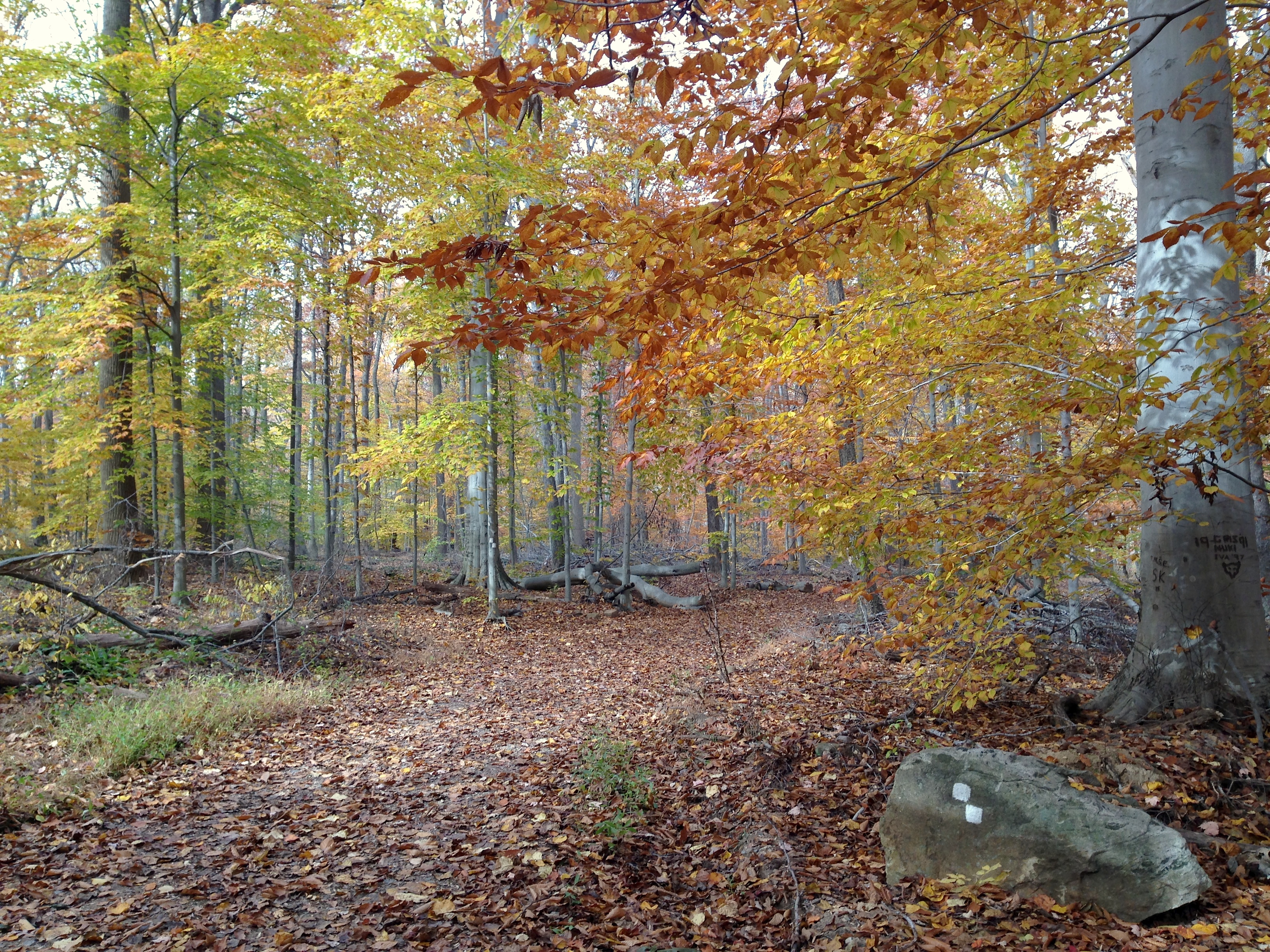
Fall foliage along Sierra Trail

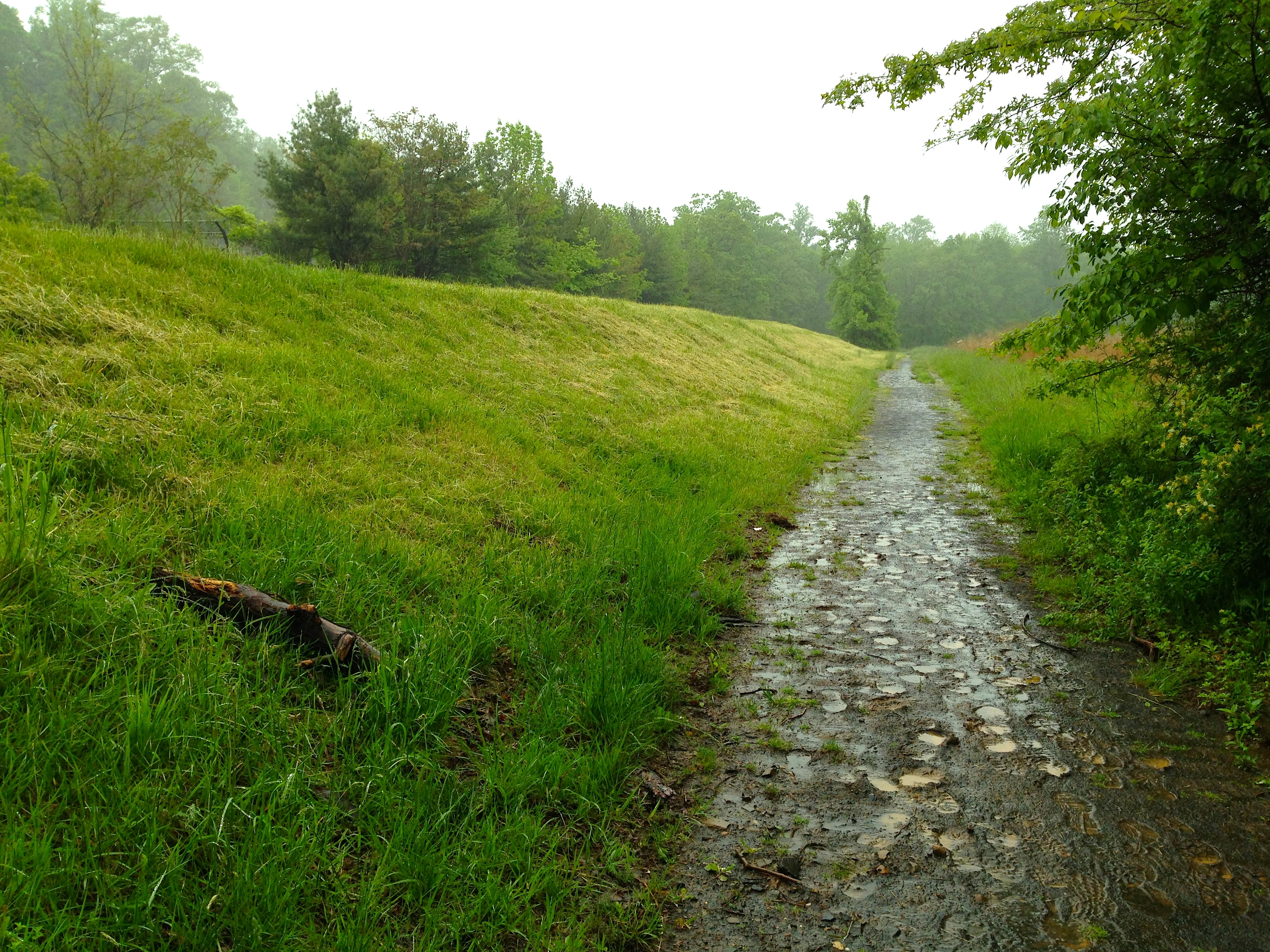
Watchung Reservation History Trail

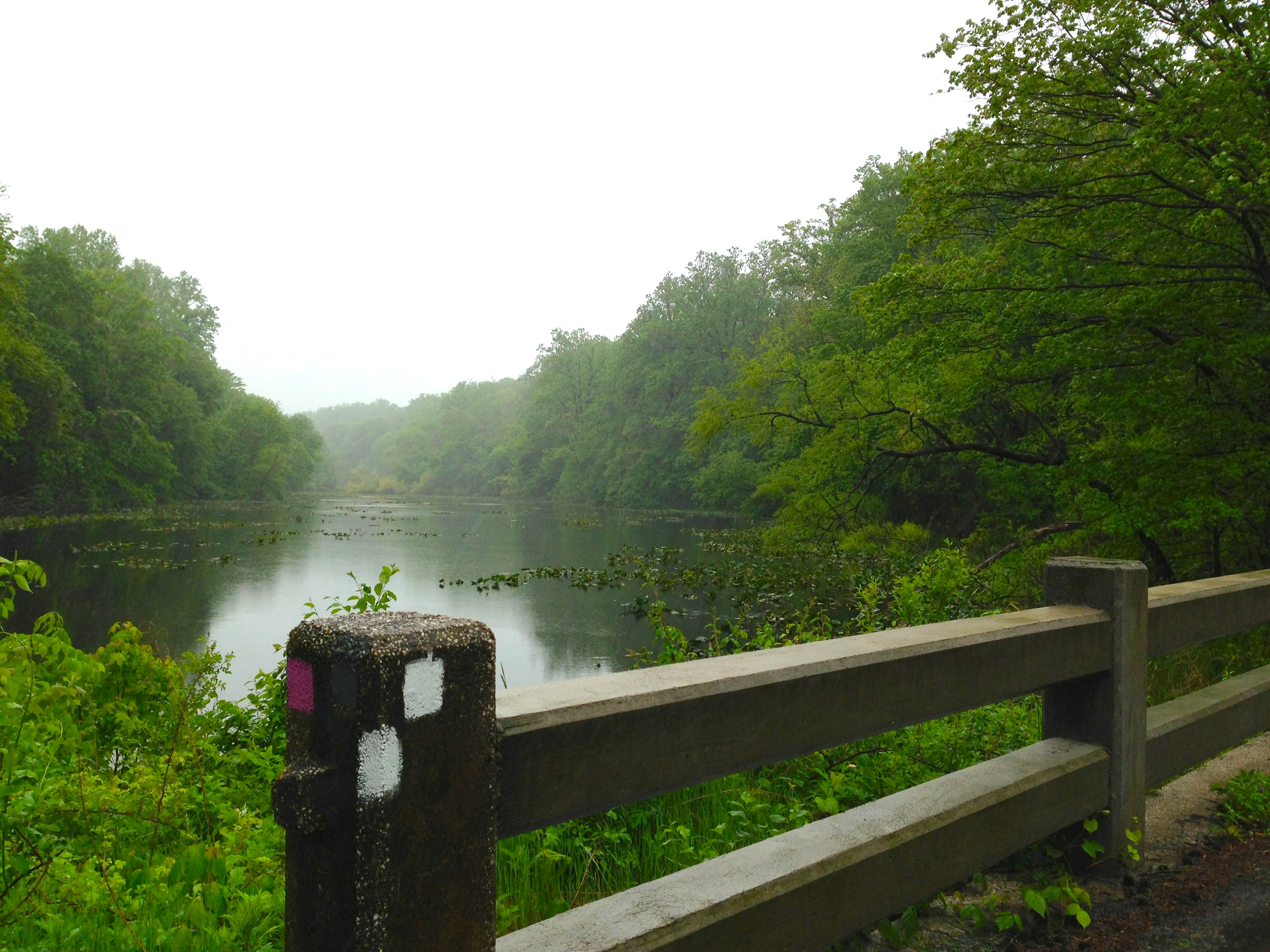
Lake Surprise, viewed from WR Tracy Drive

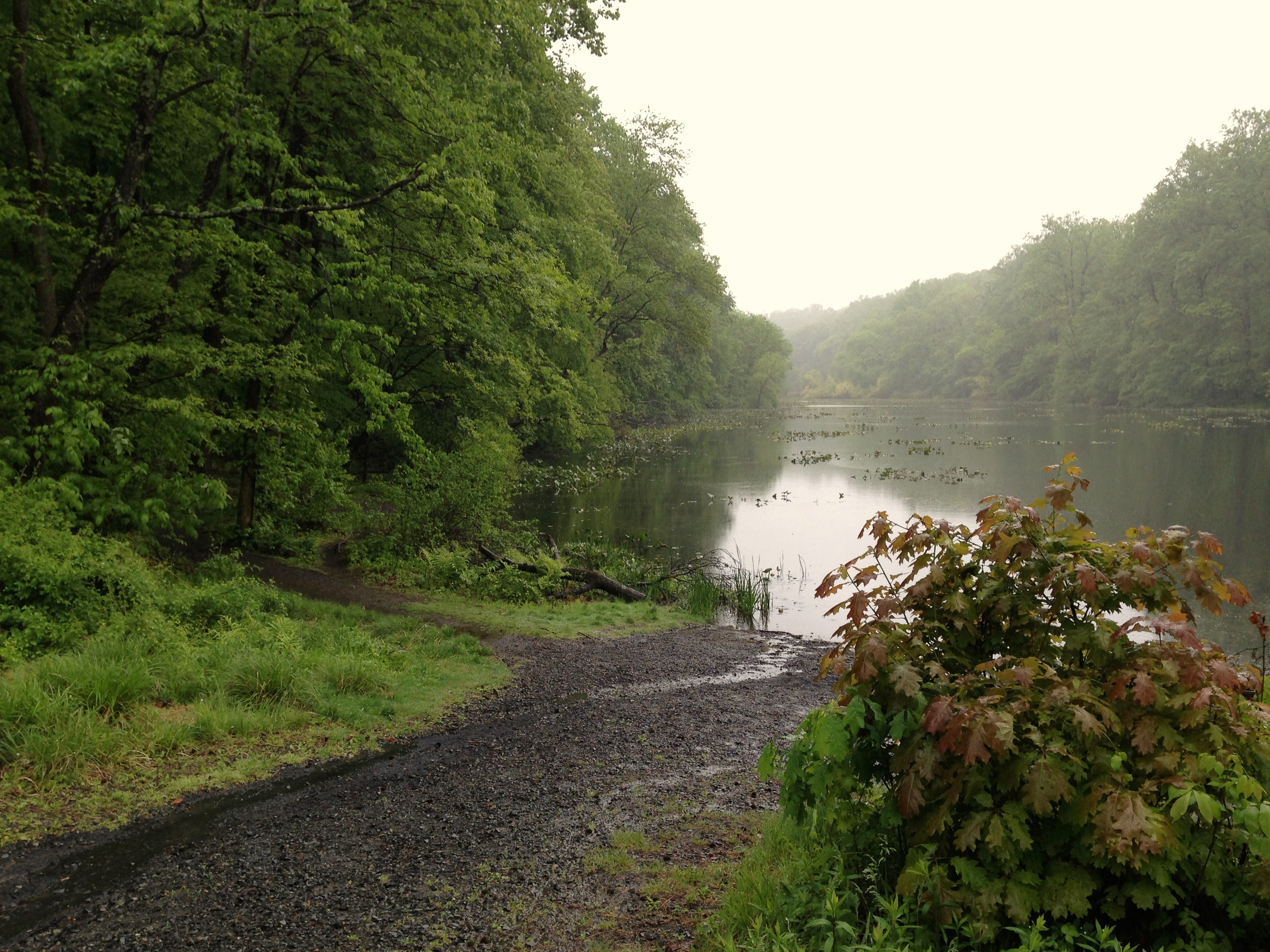
Lake Surprise Boat Launch, viewed from WR Tracy Drive

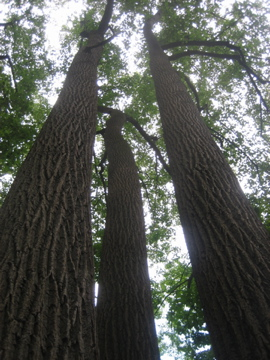
Trees in Watchung Reservation

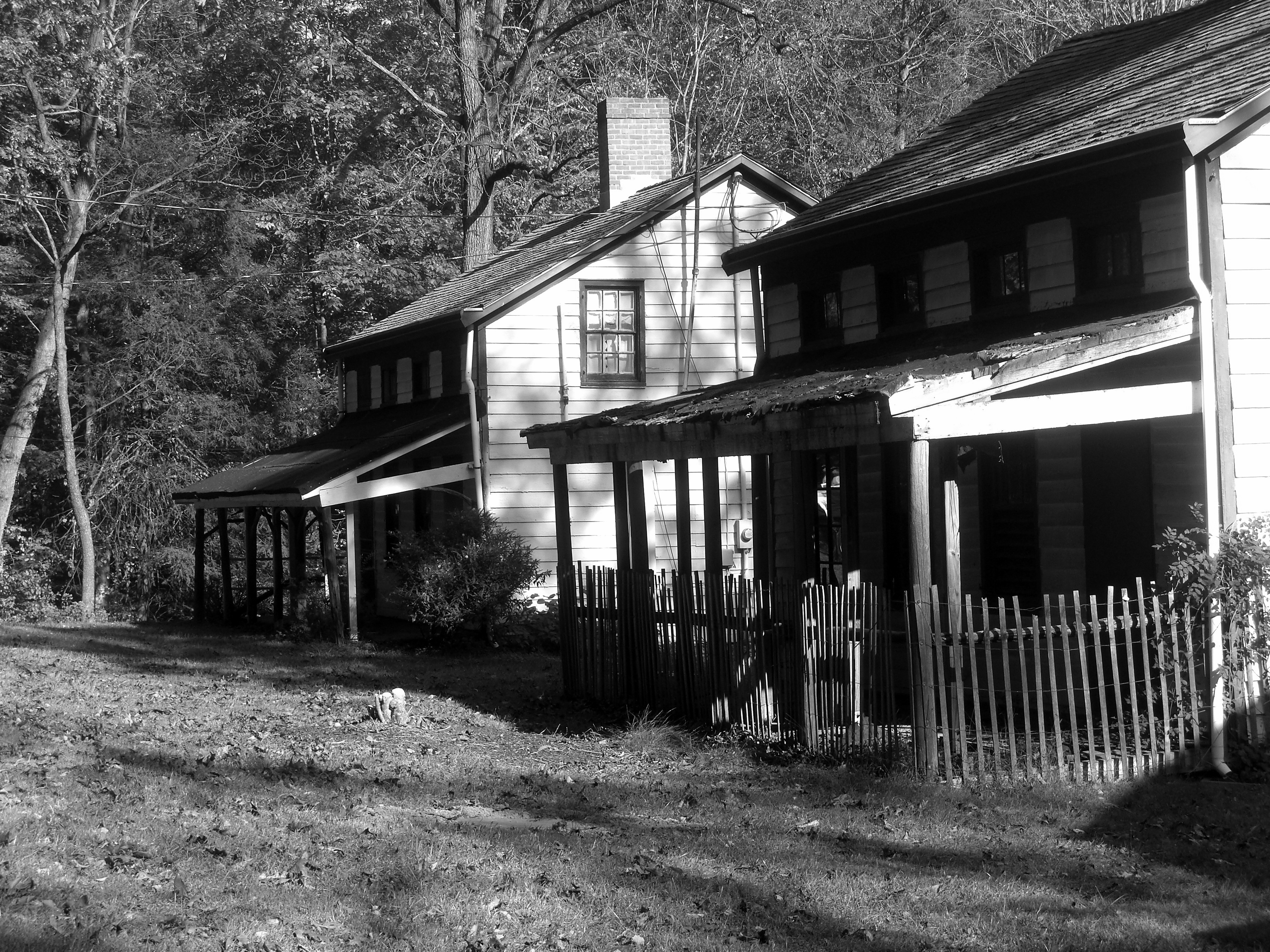
Feltville Historic District

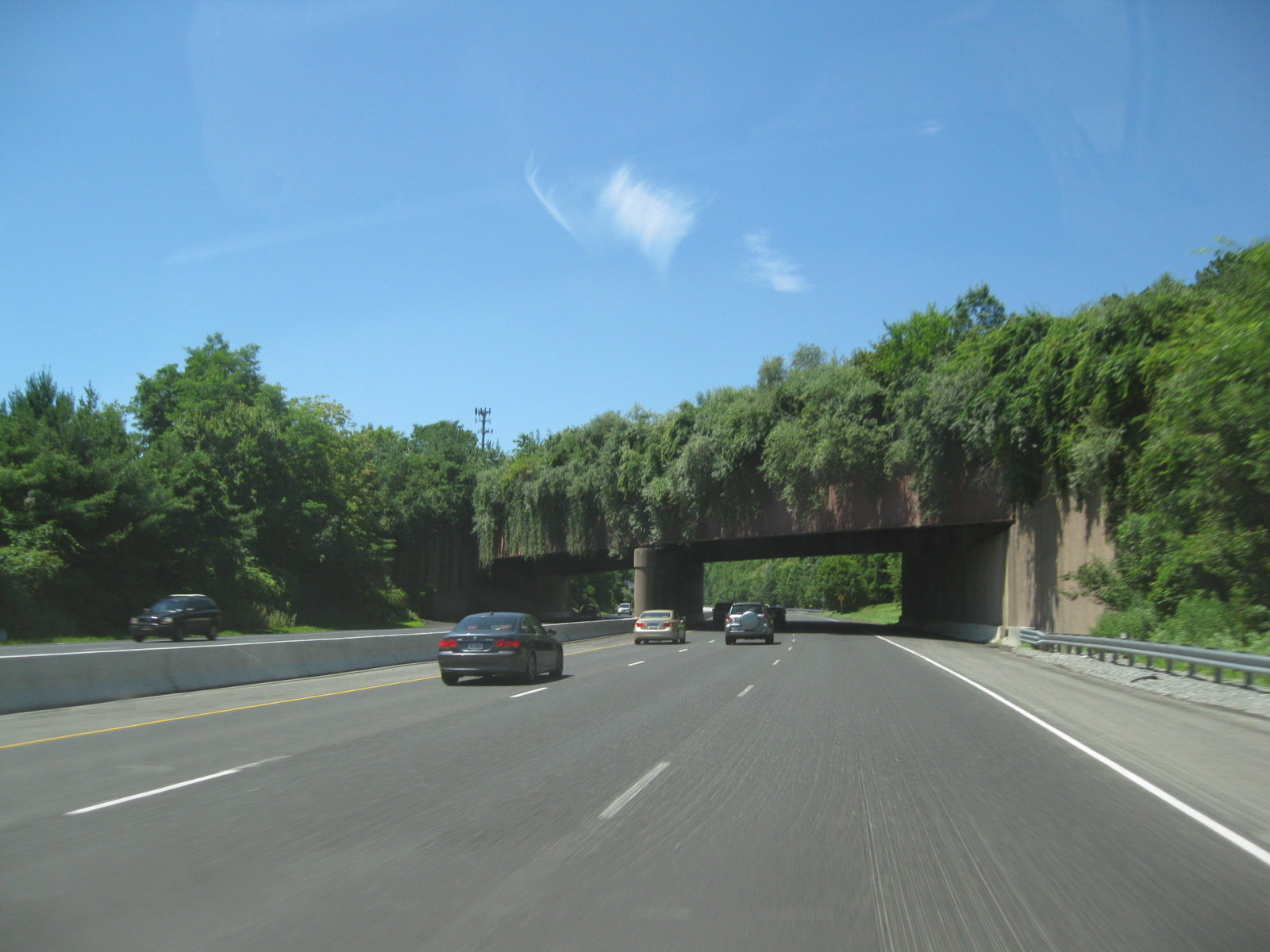
A land bridge crossing Interstate 78, joining two sections of the reservation
