= Death of Jeannette DePalma =

1972 unsolved death in Jersey City, New Jersey, U.S.

Jeannette DePalma
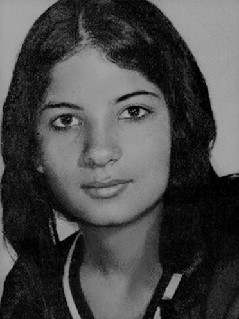
- High school portrait, 1972
- Born: Jeannette Christine DePalma; August 3, 1956; Jersey City, New Jersey, U.S.
- Died: c. August 7, 1972 (aged 16); Springfield Township, Union County, New Jersey, U.S.
- Cause of death: Believed to be murder by strangulation
- Body discovered: September 19, 1972
- Occupation: Student

Jeannette DePalma (August 3, 1956 – c. August 7, 1972) was an American teenager who is believed to have been murdered sometime on or around August 7, 1972, in Springfield Township, Union County, New Jersey. Her body was discovered the following month on a cliff (known to locals as "the Devil's Teeth") located in Springfield's Houdaille Quarry. The events of her death were subject to sensationalist coverage in local media for rumored connections to alleged occult activity in the area.

The case, currently unsolved, has become a matter of significant controversy due in part to coverage in Weird NJ magazine and in the 2015 book Death on the Devil's Teeth, which proposed several theories but no firm conclusions. In an updated story from September 2024, Weird NJ magazine stated they were "confident that there was no 'occult activity' involved in her death", after reviewing the crime scene photographs.

The mystery is analyzed in Hulu's Out There: Crimes of the Paranormal; Episode 4, "Jersey Witch Hunt", which features DePalma's case with the organization Justice for Jeannette. The organization Justice for Jeannette DePalma is "dedicated to keeping her memory alive." The organizers continue to look for clues.

== Discovery of body ==
On the afternoon of Monday, August 7, 1972, 16-year-old Jeannette DePalma left her home on Clearview Road in Springfield Township, Union County, New Jersey, telling her mother that she was going to take a train to a friend's house. When she did not arrive at her friend's house or return later that evening, her parents filed a missing person report with the Springfield Police Department the following day.

Six weeks later, on September 19, DePalma's remains were found atop a cliff inside of Springfield's Houdaille Quarry after a local dog brought her decomposing right forearm and hand back to its owner.

According to several witnesses at the scene, DePalma's skeletal remains were surrounded by a series of strange and possibly occult objects. Descriptions vary, but the most commonly agreed-upon account states that the remains were found inside a coffin-shaped perimeter of fallen branches and logs, and inside this perimeter were several small makeshift wooden crosses. Some Springfield residents later claimed that DePalma's remains were found lying on a pentagram, surrounded by mutilated animal remains. Law enforcement authorities have denied that this was true. Further controversy was aroused when it was discovered that the body had been found on a cliff known to locals for several decades as "the Devil's Teeth."

== Investigation ==
The Springfield Police Department began an investigation of DePalma's death after an autopsy could not reveal a cause of death. Her remains and clothing showed no evidence of bone fractures, bullet wounds, or knife strikes. No drug paraphernalia was found on or around the body. For undisclosed reasons, the coroner suspected that strangulation was the cause of death, leading the Union County Prosecutor's Office to treat the case as an unsolved homicide. The coroner also discovered an unusually high amount of lead in the remains, but no explanation was found for this occurrence either.

Early in the investigation, Springfield police received a tip regarding a homeless man living in the woods near the quarry. This man was known to locals simply as "Red," and it was alleged that he fled his campsite in the woods shortly after DePalma went missing. While this lead initially looked promising, the Union County Prosecutor's Office ultimately decided that "Red" had nothing to do with DePalma's death. Investigators continued to attempt to find leads, but due to a lack of tips from the public, along with inconsistent stories told to the police by her family, friends, and peers, the case eventually went cold.

Despite rumors and innuendo offered by Springfield police regarding DePalma possibly dying as the result of a drug overdose, no drug paraphernalia was found on, near, or around her body, and she was not known by friends or family to have used any recreational or prescription drugs other than occasionally smoking marijuana socially. DePalma's autopsy report makes no mention of the possibility of a drug overdose, and medical examiner Bernard Ehrenberg went on record stating he suspected strangulation, as he could not rule it out during the autopsy of her remains.

The Hulu documentary interviews a retired police officer who never entered Jeannette's purse into evidence.

== Possibility of human sacrifice ==
Around two weeks after the discovery of DePalma's remains, several newspapers, including the Newark Star-Ledger and the New York Daily News, began reporting that she may have been the victim of an occult sacrifice carried out either by Satanists or by a local coven of witches who operated inside nearby Watchung Reservation. This coverage was spurred by reports that the body had been found surrounded by strange objects, and by the theories of James Tate, the pastor of the DePalma family's Assemblies of God church. Rumors about the case set off a panic in several Union County communities, which were still recovering from the shock of the John List murders only ten months earlier.

== Aftermath ==
In the late 1990s and early 2000s, Weird NJ magazine began to report on the decades-old cold case after receiving several anonymous letters regarding DePalma's death. Editor and co-founder Mark Moran began investigating the case and wrote about many purportedly suspicious details, including the allegation that Springfield police had lost or destroyed the case file. The Springfield Police Department maintains that the file was lost due to flooding caused by Hurricane Floyd in 1999. Others allege that a copy is still on file.

Moran eventually teamed up with Weird NJ correspondent Jesse P. Pollack to write the book Death on the Devil's Teeth: The Strange Murder That Shocked Suburban New Jersey. Throughout the course of their research, Pollack and Moran discovered several instances of a possible cover-up, connections to other unsolved murders, and previously unknown suspects. In September 2024, Weird NJ reported they had acquired copies of DePalma's case file from the Union County Prosecutor's Office. According to the magazine, they reviewed the photographs from the crime scene, and stated they were "confident that there was no 'occult activity' involved in her death". The magazine further stated they found no evidence of "crosses made from sticks and twigs" or a "halo of stones" or "animal sacrifices" that were allegedly found near the body in the crime scene photographs.

Edward Salzano sued the Union County Prosecutor's Office to test Jeannette DePalma's clothing for DNA. Salzano was given a box of documents that contained the FBI crime lab report and medical examiners report by John Bancey, Jeannette DePalma's nephew, before he died. The crime lab report states stains found in her underwear, bra, blouse and slacks were "too decomposed for conclusive blood and semen examinations" in 1972.

"In 2021 The New York Daily News mentions that the organization, named Justice for Jeannette DePalma", "is dedicated to keeping her memory alive." "The organizers are continuing to look for clues, even as the case approaches the half-century mark." In 2022, The Daily Beast wrote an updated article on DePalma's case. In 2024, The Mirror wrote an updated article. Jeannette DePalma is mentioned in the book "A Long Walk Home" urging her case to be changed from a suspicious death to a homicide. The book mentions similarities between Jeannette DePalma, Joan Kramer and Carol Ann Farino Killings.

== Possible connection to Richard Cottingham ==
During the spring of 2021, convicted New Jersey serial killer Richard Cottingham, also known as the ‘Torso killer’, made a series of written statements to journalist Jesse P. Pollack alluding to him having possibly abducted and killed DePalma while she was hitchhiking. Pollack forwarded this correspondence to the Union County Prosecutor's Office after Cottingham agreed to speak with investigators if they would meet with him. Cottingham's statements regarding Jeannette's murder were later printed in the 2022 updated and revised edition of Death on the Devil's Teeth. As of December 2022, no updates have been given by law enforcement.

== See also ==
- List of murdered American children
- Lists of solved missing person cases
- Ricky Kasso
