= Houdaille Quarry =

Quarry located in Springfield Township, Union County, New Jersey, US

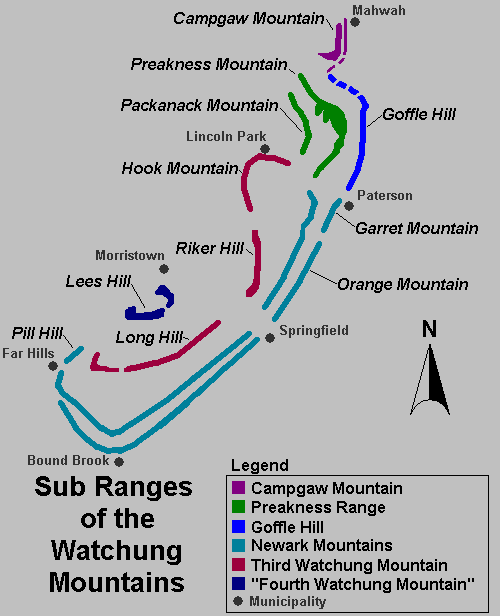
The Houdaille Quarry sits directly to the left of the Springfield dot marking the Hobart Gap, in the first Watchung Mountain

The Houdaille Quarry is a 120-acre (49 ha) former rock quarry located in Springfield Township, Union County, New Jersey bordering the northern edge of the Baltusrol Golf Club.

Bisected by Interstate 78, it is directly east of the Watchung Reservation and touches the Summit border as well as Hidden Valley Park.

Owned by Union County, New Jersey and typically closed to the public aside from occasional ecological tours, it is called the “Grand Canyon of Union County."

== Ecology ==
The quarry is at a stage referred to as "early ecological succession" which, in ecological terms, is the beginning of transformation to an old-growth forest. Because of its isolation since operations ceased, the quarry contains fewer invasive species than neighboring Watchung Reservation. One Kean University scientist noted that "The quarry is a very unique environment," home to many native wildflower species. "And that is exciting to see ... The quarry is not as extensively invaded as other areas. There are still a lot of great mosses and lichens."

The Springfield Environmental Commission, which conducts foliage walks in the former quarry, has described it as an

[E]cologically unique wild area in Springfield, located between Rt.78 and Mount View Rd., with trails to a deep basin and to a beautiful pond where wild turkeys, foxes, coyotes and colorful migrating birds have been spotted. It is an important part of the greenway linking Briant Park, Hidden Valley Park, and Watchung Reservation.

In 2009, the annual Union County Bio-Blitz biodiversity survey was conducted in Hidden Valley Park, Briant Park and Houdaille Quarry. It produced a diverse list of species: 60 fungi, 258 insects, nine aquatic invertebrates (both pollution intolerant and pollution sensitive species), eight species of reptiles and amphibians, six species of fish (three of which were invasive species), 50 birds and nine mammals.

The area is part of the Watchung Mountain range along with its neighbor, Watchung Reservation. Today, along the summits of the Watchungs, talus slope environs as well as globally rare trap rock glade/outcrop communities and their unique species have become threatened by development. As a response, efforts to conserve the unique landscapes of the Watchungs have been undertaken.

== History ==
Houdaille was historically known as the Summit Quarry or Commonwealth Quarry and was one of the Rahway Valley Railroad's major customers. The abandoned rail line of the railroad has been suggested by some as a potential rail-to-trail for cycling and walking.

The Hudson Institute of Mineralogy writes:

This quarry in the Orange Mountain (First Watchung) basalt began operating in the early 1900s under the ownership of Louis Keller. Originally named The Commonwealth Quarry, it was later obtained by the North Jersey Quarry Company. In the 1950s, the Houdaille Construction Materials Company purchased the quarry and ran it until 1977. In the early 1970s, the Interstate-78 road cut was excavated immediately adjacent to the pit, and across the access road between the quarry and the plant. The access road was in a cut. A bridge was constructed over this cut to accommodate I-78 while keeping the quarry functioning. However, the quarry closed only 2 or 3 years later in the aftermath of the 1973 oil embargo and the resulting increase in fuel and asphalt prices.

In the 1970s, the remains of a teenage girl named Jeannette DePalma, who lived with her family in Springfield, were discovered atop the Houdaille Quarry cliff known as The Devil's Teeth.

== Geology ==
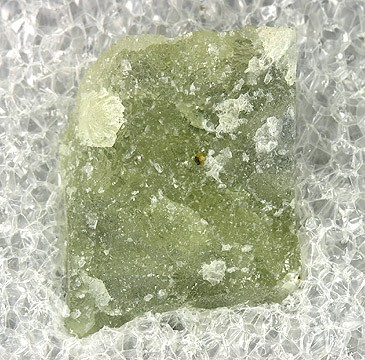
A sample of greenockite collected at the Houdaille Quarry in 1964.

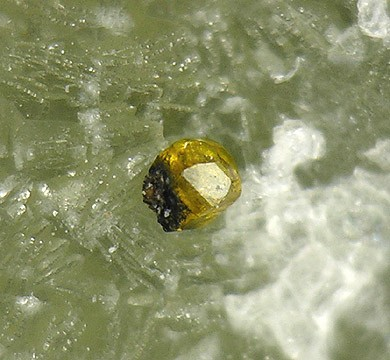
A greenockite crystal in the center of a specimen collected at Houdaille which has a small crystal of chalcopyrite at the base. The crystals are sitting on a green prehnite matrix.

Basalt was once quarried from the Orange Mountain Basalt here, and crushed to make gravel for road construction. The quarry is also noted for crystals of greenockite.

Greenockite is a rather rare species, considering it has a very simple chemistry (cadmium sulfide). There are only a handful of localities in the world for fine crystallized greenockite specimens, and the Houdaille Quarry is possibly the best U.S. locality for the species (certainly the best in New Jersey).

Pumpellyite has been collected there as well.

== Current uses ==
The county's largest leaf composting operation takes place at Houdaille.
