= Roberto de la Selva =

Artist

Nicaraguan-born Roberto de la Selva (1895–1957) was an artist who moved to Mexico City in 1921 as a protest against U.S. military occupation. He was an associate of Diego Rivera and the brother of poet Salomón de la Selva.

His work may be seen in the Watchung Reservation.

De la Selva studied art at Mexico City’s Academy of San Carlos and apprenticed as a wood craftsman in the town of Apizaco. He worked in both bas relief woodworking and some painting.
