= Feltville Historic District =

Historic district in New Jersey, United States

- U.S. National Register of Historic Places
- U.S. Historic district
- New Jersey Register of Historic Places
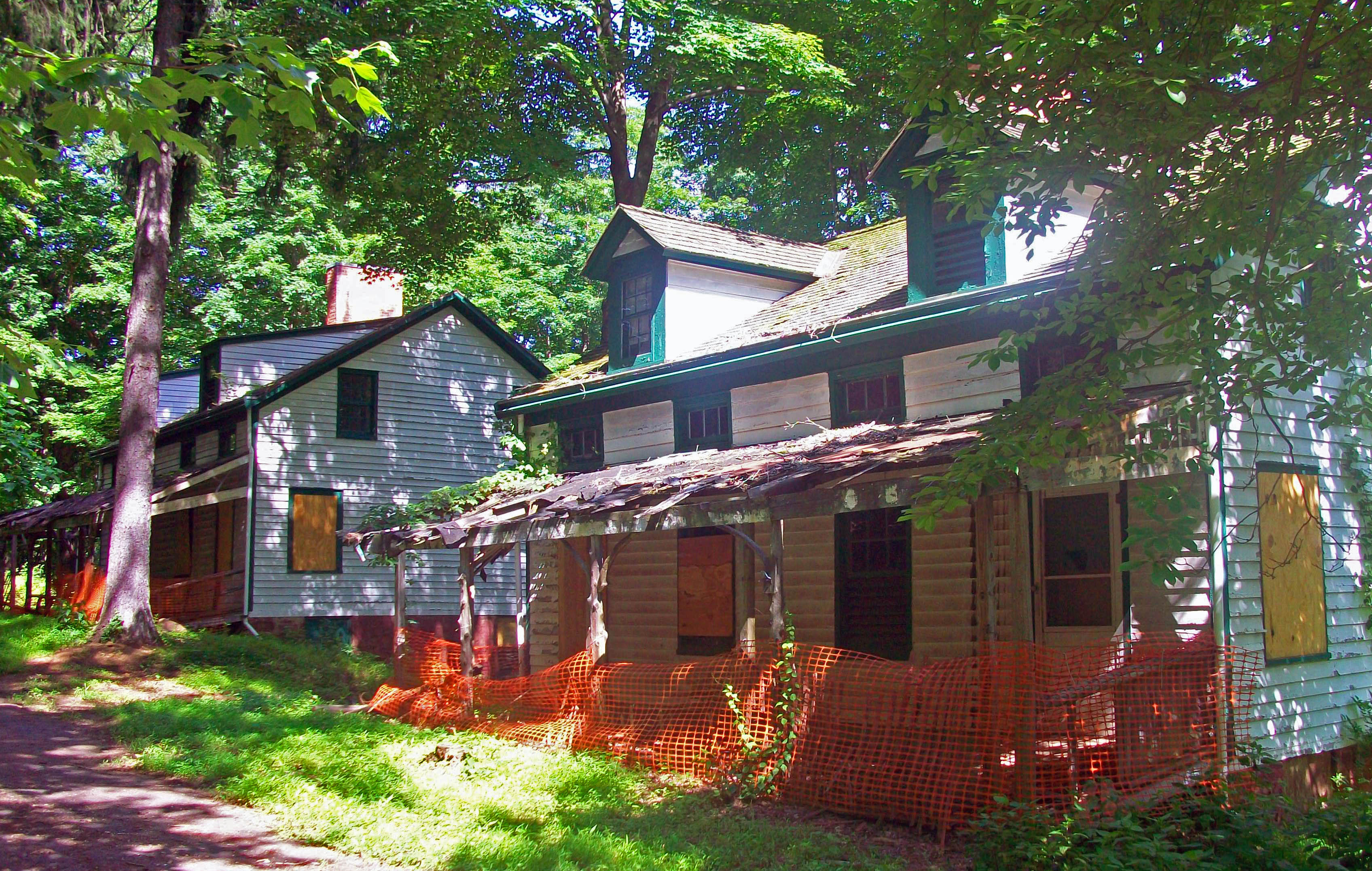
- East elevations of two remaining vacant houses, 2009

- Location within Union County, New Jersey Location within New Jersey Location within the United States
- Location: Berkeley Heights, NJ
- Coordinates: 40°40′53″N 74°23′13″W
- Area: 130 acres (53 ha)
- Built: 1825–1882
- NRHP reference No.: 80002522
- NJRHP No.: 2648

Significant dates
- Added to NRHP: June 6, 1980
- Designated NJRHP: February 20, 1980

The Feltville Historic District, located in the Watchung Reservation in Berkeley Heights, Union County, New Jersey, United States, is a historic area which contains several buildings dating to the 18th century. It is known locally as "Deserted Village."

The district includes eight houses, a church, a carriage house, and a general house. Over the years the "deserted village of Feltville" was a mill town, a farming community, and a summer resort. Only three families remain as permanent residents, while the remainder of the site is open to visitors who wish to learn of its history or to simply enjoy the forested surroundings. It was added to the National Register of Historic Places on June 6, 1980 for its significance in agriculture, archaeology, commerce, education, industry and community planning.

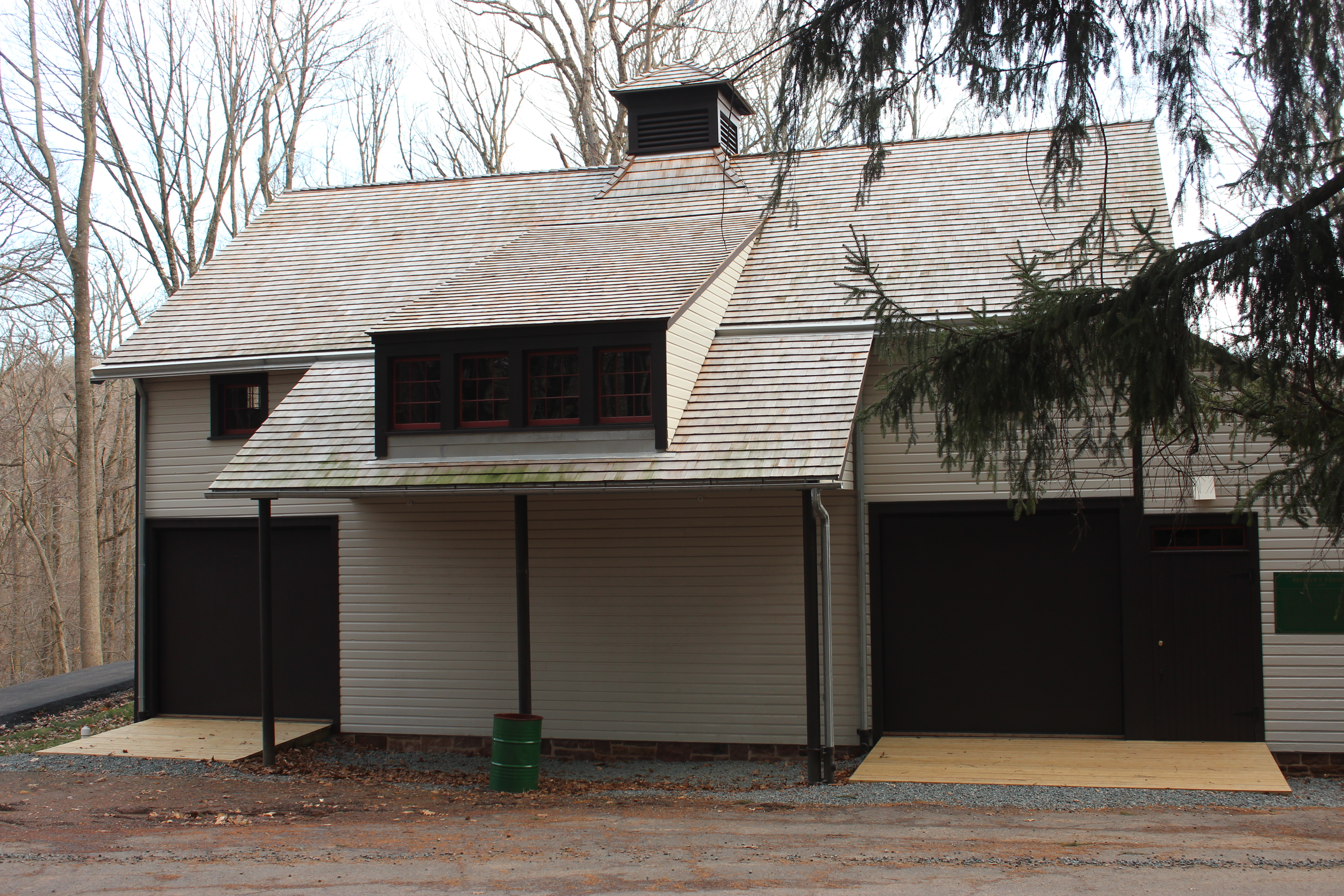
Masker's Barn, restored in September 2011

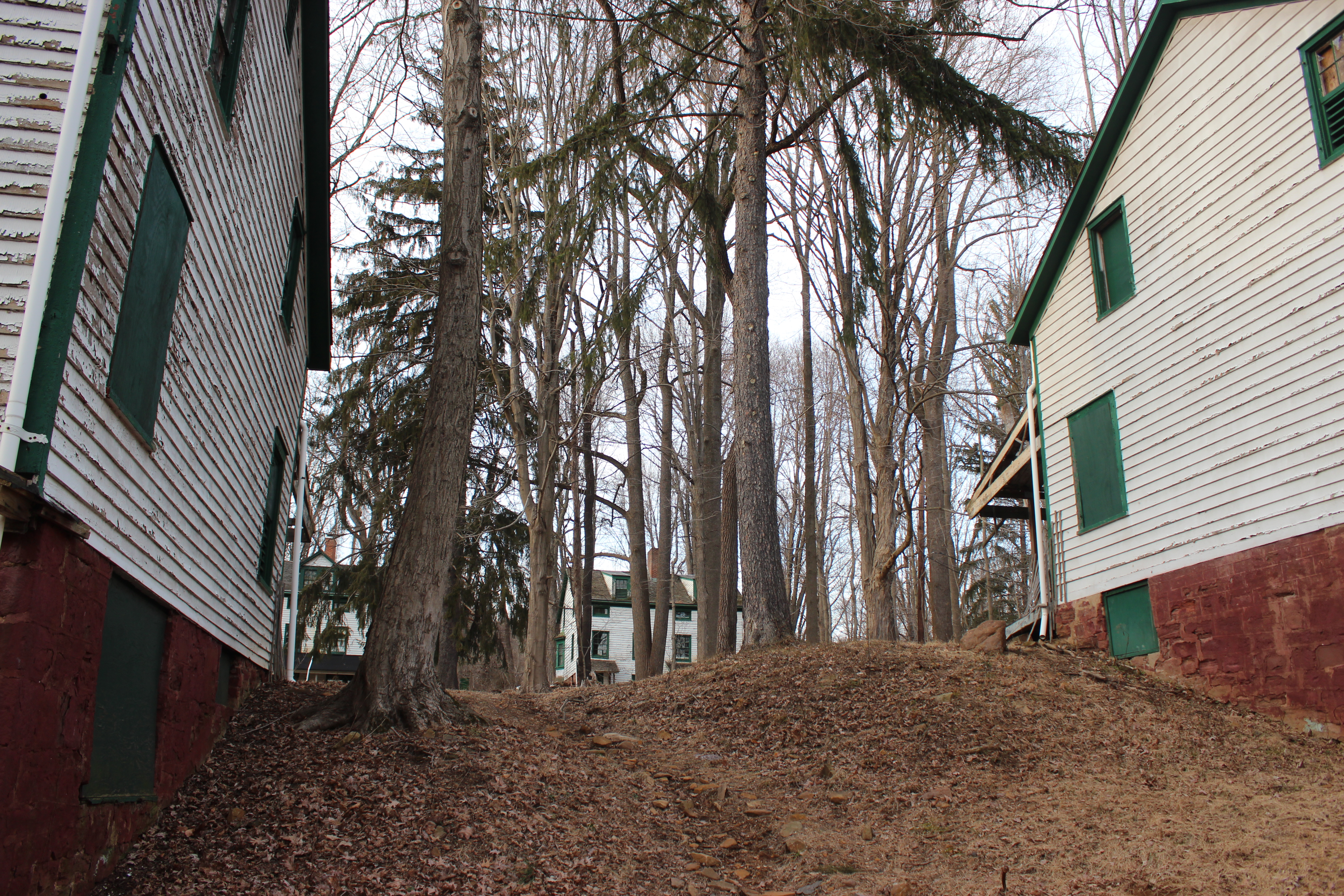
Empty houses in Feltville, January 2012

== History ==
The first settler of this area was Peter Willcox, an Englishman who moved here from Long Island about 1736. The area then was a frontier. He built a sawmill, but it was demolished as more people came to the area.

David Felt, a businessman in Boston, Massachusetts, decided to move to New York City in 1825. By 1844, the production of his mill could not grow fast enough to meet the demands of the merchants he supplied, so Felt began to look for land in New Jersey on which to build a second factory. Eventually he bought land from the descendants of Peter Willcox, and in two years, he had built a mill on Blue Brook, two dams for the mill, and a town for the workers in the mill. He named this new town "Feltville". Within the little town, Felt gained the nickname of "King David", for he required the residents to attend services in the churchhouse and their children to attend classes in a one-room schoolhouse.

By 1850, about 175 people lived in Feltville, often four families in each of the larger houses and two in each of the smaller. Also in that year, a nondenominational "Union Church" with a resident pastor was active. After fifteen years, "King David" Felt sold the property, and after several successor businesses failed, the place became known as "the deserted village". In 1882, it was bought by Warren Ackerman, who transformed it to a summer resort called Glenside Park. Interest soon dwindled as more people chose to summer on the shore of New Jersey instead. After the place was again deserted, the Union Country Park Commission bought it and included it in the Watchung Reservation, renting the houses to families. The houses were stabilized recently. In September 2011 Masker's Barn, the carriage house built by Warren Ackerman, was restored. The hall served as a cafeteria and lecture hall from 1966 to 1984.

Since many of the main structures are no longer standing, an ongoing preservation effort aims to show visitors how the inhabitants of Feltville-Glenside Park once lived. The main missing buildings are the mill, the Felt Mansion, the dormitories, and the school. The foundation of the mill is still visible next to Blue Brook, which runs farther downhill of the buildings that still stand.

== Tourist attractions ==
County staff also provides activities on certain weekends where they have children's games, a demonstration of apple cider pressing, and a display of archaeological artifacts.

During the month of October, two weeks before Halloween, there are haunted hayrides for families. They ride through this town, explaining the noted people throughout this town's history and of course adding special effects.

This is open to the public daily and there is a visitor center where brochures are given.

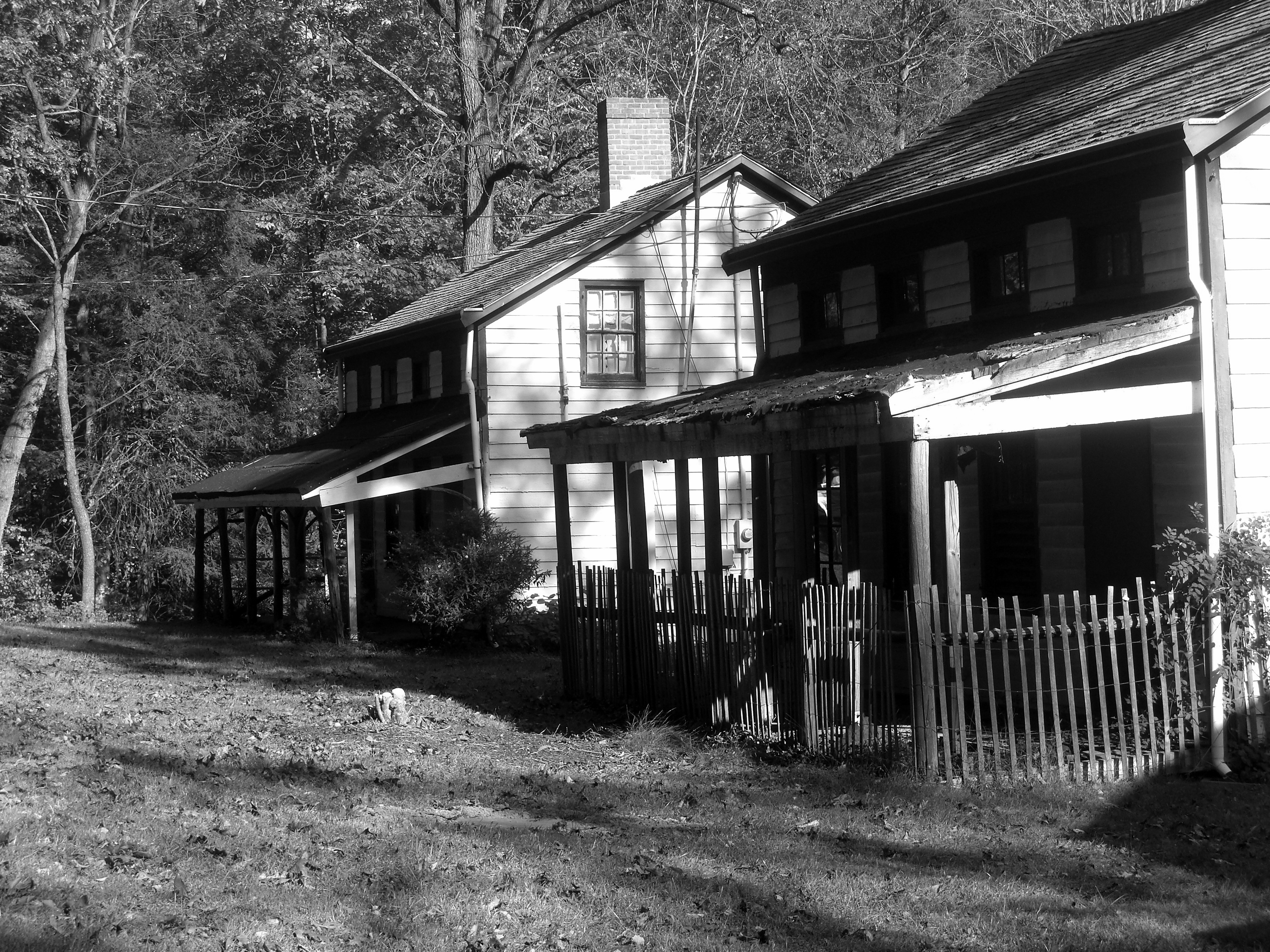
Feltville in October 2011

=== The Murals de la Selva ===
In 1916, the Deserted Village fell into decline upon the closure of Glenside Park. A local civil engineer and travel enthusiast named Edward J. Grassmann purchased a number of properties to serve as a club. Grassmann was a lifelong Elizabeth resident who made his fortune in land surveying and kaolin processing; the trust that bears his name is still in existence today.

Grassmann decorated two of his structures at the Deserted Village to demonstrate his fondness for the Southwest and Latin America. He called one the "Mexican Cottage" and the other he christened as the "Indian Cottage."

It was Grassmann who apparently persuaded celebrated Nicaraguan/Mexican artist Roberto de la Selva to paint themed murals throughout the first floor interior of the Mexican Cottage. In the late 1920s, during his first trip to the United States, de la Selva spent months in rural Union County painting the murals, which depict native Mexicans at work, play and worship, including statues of both ancient gods and the Virgin Mary. As the only murals [that] de la Selva, who was primarily a sculptor, is known to have painted, these murals are significant to both the history of Feltville and the international art world.

In 2013, the murals' site in the Deserted Village was named by Preservation New Jersey as one of the 10 Most Endangered Historic Sites in New Jersey.

== Rumors of ghosts ==
A popular local legend tells of three ghosts living in the house furthest down the path. The story claims the rumors originated in 1912, when three young sisters all went camping deep in the woods, but did not return. Locals were only able to find their bonnets, and the fears of the people caused almost half of the residents to move away. Those that remained never let their children go deep in the woods again without supervision.
