= Musical settings of sayings of Jesus on the cross =

Genre of Christian music

Musical settings of sayings of Jesus on the cross are compositions which set seven short phrases uttered by Jesus on the cross, as gathered from the four Christian Gospels narrating the Crucifixion of Jesus. Several composers have written musical settings of the traditional collection of seven sayings, sometimes called Seven Last Words and ultima septem verba, for various combinations of voice and/or instruments. Eventually these settings became a separate form of Passion music. Perhaps the most outstanding work in this genre in the Lutheran tradition is the work by Heinrich Schütz. Joseph Haydn composed string quartets titled Die sieben letzten Worte unseres Erlösers am Kreuze (The seven last words of our Redeemer on the cross).

== Chronological list of settings ==
Early Latin motet settings of the ultima septem verba can be found from 1500.

=== 16th century ===
- John Browne: O mater venerabilis, c. 1500, Latin polyphonic votive antiphon (contains the phrase 'Heloy, Heloy, lama zabathani' - 'My God, my God, why hast thou forsaken me?')
- Robert Fayrfax: Maria plena virtute, before 1521, Latin polyphonic votive antiphon (contains six of the sayings)

=== 17th century ===
- Heinrich Schütz: Die sieben Worte Jesu Christi am Kreuz, SWV 478 (1645), German cantata
- Augustin Pfleger: Passio, sive Septem Verba Christi in cruce pendentis (c. 1670), Latin

=== 18th century ===
- Pergolesi: Septem verba a Christo in cruce moriente prolata (attributed, 1730–1736)
- Christoph Graupner: Die sieben Worte des Heilands am Kreuz, cantata cycle, Darmstadt (1743)
- Joseph Haydn: Die sieben letzten Worte unseres Erlösers am Kreuze (The seven last words of our Redeemer on the cross, 1787)
- Francisco Javier García Fajer: Septem ultima verba christi in cruce (1787), Latin oratorio
- Giuseppe Giordani alias "Giordaniello": Tre ore dell'Agonia di N.S. Gesù Cristo (1790), oratorio

=== 19th century ===
- Niccolò Antonio Zingarelli: Tre ore dell'Agonia (1825), oratorio
- Saverio Mercadante: Le sette ultime parole di Nostro Signore Gesù Cristo (1838), oratorio
- Charles Gounod: Les Sept Paroles de Notre Seigneur Jésus-Christ sur la Croix (1855), choral work
- César Franck: Les Sept Paroles du Christ sur la Croix (1859), choral work
- Théodore Dubois: Les sept paroles du Christ (1867), choral work
- Edmund Dumas, "Weeping Savior" (1869), in Original Sacred Harp; uses Isaac Watts' "Alas and did my Savior bleed" for main lyrics
- Fernand de La Tombelle: Les sept Paroles de Notre Seigneur Jésus-Christ (1867)

=== 20th century ===
- Charles Tournemire: Sept Chorals-Poèmes pour les sept Paroles du Christ for organ (1935)
- Knut Nystedt: "Jesu syv ord på korset", Op. 47, oratorio for solo and mixed choir The Seven Words from the Cross (1960).
- Alan Ridout: The Seven Last Words for organ (1965)
- "The Crucifixion" from Jesus Christ Superstar (1969), by Tim Rice and Andrew Lloyd Webber
- Douglas Allanbrook The Seven Last Words for mezzo-soprano, baritone, chorus and orchestra (1970)
- Sofia Gubaidulina Sieben Worte for cello, bayan, and strings (1982)
- James MacMillan: Seven Last Words from the Cross, cantata for choir and strings (1993)
- Ruth Zechlin: Die sieben letzten Worte Jesu am Kreuz for organ (1996)

=== 21st century ===
- The 2001 System of a Down song Chop Suey! references "Father into your hands I commend my spirit" (Luke 23:46) and "Why have you forsaken me?" (Mark 15:34 and Matthew 27:46).
- Christophe Looten, Mourning (2008)
- Tristan Murail: Les Sept Paroles for orchestra, chorus and electronics (2010)
- Daan Manneke: The Seven Last Words Oratorio for chamber choir (2011)
- Paul Carr: Seven Last Words from the Cross for soloist, choir and orchestra (2013)
- Juan Jurado: Seven Words (2013) for mixed choir and four cellos.
- Rotting Christ: Ze Nigmar (2016)
- Richard Burchard: The Seven Last Words of Christ for choir, strings, and organ (2016)
- Michael John Trotta: Seven Last Words (Septem Ultima Verba) for choir and orchestra (2017)
- Philipp Ortmeier: Seven Words for baritone and chamber orchestra (2017/18)
- Andrew Peterson: Last Words (Tenebrae) (2018)
- Pamela Decker: The Seven Last Words and Triumph of Christ (in 2 parts) for organ (2018)
- Paulo Ferreira-Lopes: Die sieben Worte Jesu Christi am Kreuz for chamber ensemble and electronics (2019)
