= Irene Griffin =

American politician

- In office 1944–1945

Personal details
- Born: July 25, 1899 Ohio, United States
- Died: April 1983 (aged 83)
- Party: Republican
- Spouse: Oscar D. Griffin
- Children: 2 daughters, 1 son

Irene T. Griffin (July 25, 1899 – April 1983) was an American Republican Party politician who served in the New Jersey General Assembly. She served one year in the Legislature, but became a bit of a perennial candidate, losing three races for the Assembly, two for the Senate, and one for Congress. Griffin first ran for the State Assembly in 1942, but lost the Republican primary to future U.S. Senator Clifford P. Case, future State Senator Kenneth Hand, and two others. When Case ran for Congress in 1944, Griffin ran again and won the nomination and the election. She did run for a second term in 1945, but sought the Republican nomination for State Senator in 1947, losing to hand in the primary. She ran again for Assembly in 1951, but lost the primary to incumbent Florence P. Dwyer. She again challenged Dwyer in 1956, this time in a primary for the U.S. House of Representatives; she lost and Dwyer went on to unseat an incumbent in the general election. She ran for the Assembly in 1957, upsetting the frontrunner, Nelson Stamler in the Republican primary. She lost the General Election to Democrat Mildred Barry Hughes. Griffin lost a State Senate primary in 1962 to Stamler, who had since been elected Assemblyman. In 1967, she lost a Republican primary for State Assembly to Hugo Pfaltz and Peter J. McDonough by a 2-1 margin.

Born in Ohio, she was married to Oscar D. Griffin. They had three children: Ruth, Harriett and John.
