= Arthur Manner =

American politician

Arthur A. Manner (December 18, 1912 - August 1981) was an American Republican Party politician who served in the New Jersey General Assembly from 1972 to 1974. He served as a Mayor and Township Committeeman in Berkeley Heights, New Jersey and as a Union County Freeholder.

Manner was born on December 18, 1912, in Jersey City, New Jersey, where he attended the local public schools.

When Republican Hugo Pfaltz declined to seek re-election in 1971, Manner ran for the State Assembly on a ticket with incumbent Peter J. McDonough, defeating Democrats Eugene Campbell and A. Charles Walano by a wide margin. He lost his bid for re-election to a second term in 1973, a year when Democrats scored massive gains during the Watergate scandal. With McDonough running for the seat in the newly drawn District 22, Manner ran with another GOP Assemblyman, Herbert H. Kiehn; they were beaten by Democrats Betty Wilson and Arnold D'Ambrosa. Manner sought a comeback in 1975, but lost the Republican primary to Donald DiFrancesco, the municipal attorney of Scotch Plains, by 1,067 votes.
