= Arnold D'Ambrosa =

American politician

Member of the New Jersey General Assembly from the 22nd district
- In office January 8, 1974 – January 13, 1976 Serving with Betty Wilson
- Preceded by: District created
- Succeeded by: Donald DiFrancesco; William J. Maguire

Personal details
- Born: December 1, 1933
- Died: February 9, 2018 (aged 85) Brick Township, New Jersey
- Party: Republican
- Other political affiliations: Democratic (through 1970s)

Arnold J. D'Ambrosa (December 1, 1932 – February 9, 2018) was an American official who served in the General Assembly from 1974 to 1976 from the 22nd Legislative District. His political career was cut short by scandal.

== Biography ==
The Rahway Democratic Municipal Chairman and the city's Director of Public Works, D'Ambrosa was elected Assemblyman in 1973, the beneficiary of the Watergate scandal that helped Democrats score massive gains in the legislative elections. D'Ambrosa and his running mate, Betty Wilson, defeated two Republican incumbents, Herbert H. Kiehn and Arthur Manner.

He took office as an Assemblyman in January 1974. In July, he was arrested. Prosecutors charged him with selling an air conditioner owned by the City of Rahway for $600 and keeping the money. He was also accused of taking a $200 bribe from a contractor, as well as lying to a Grand Jury and misusing city assets (materials and employees) for work on his vacation home in Point Pleasant, New Jersey. He remained in office, but was not a candidate for re-election to a second term in 1975.

In January 1976, just before the expiration of his term, he was sentenced to nine months in jail after admitting to charges of embezzlement, bribery, perjury and official misconduct. Rahway also fired him from his Public Works job. After prison, D'Ambrosa relocated to Point Pleasant, where he owns a nautical supply business. He later became a Republican and contributed to Republican candidates.

D'Ambrosa died on February 9, 2018, in Brick Township.
