= Betty Wilson (politician) =

American politician

Betty Wilson (born August 21, 1932) is an American Democratic Party politician who served in the New Jersey General Assembly from 1974 to 1976 and later held posts in the administrations of President Jimmy Carter and under three Democratic New Jersey governors.

== Biography ==
Wilson started college at Jersey City State College at age 31, after her youngest child began school. She was a history teacher at Governor Livingston Regional High School and was active in the League of Women Voters before running for office. In 1971, Wilson was elected to the Berkeley Heights, New Jersey Township Committee, the first woman to win local office in that municipality. In the Watergate landslide election of 1973, Wilson ran successfully for a seat in the State Assembly. Running with Arnold D'Ambrosa, they defeated two Republican incumbents, Herbert H. Kiehn and Arthur Manner. Wilson was the top vote-getter and ran more than 6,000 votes ahead of the two Republican Assemblymen.

As a freshman legislator, Wilson won a leadership post and served as the Assembly Majority Whip. She sought re-election to a second term in 1975, but was unsuccessful. After D'Ambrosa was caught up in a political scandal, she ran with Rahway Democratic Chairman William A. Wolf; they lost to Republicans Donald DiFrancesco, who would later serve as governor, and William J. Maguire, a former Union County Freeholder. Wilson ran 2,387 votes behind DiFrancesco.

Following her loss, Governor Brendan Byrne appointed her to serve as Assistant Commissioner (and later Deputy Commissioner) of the New Jersey Department of Environmental Protection. From 1980 to 1981, she served in the Carter Administration as Associate Director for Recreational Programs at the U.S. Department of the Interior. She returned to the Byrne Administration from 1981 to 1982 as the Deputy Commissioner of the New Jersey Department of Labor and Industry. Governor James McGreevey appointed her to serve on the New Jersey Pinelands Commission in 2002. In 2005, Governor Richard Codey named her Chairman. (Codey and Wilson were freshman legislators together in 1974.) She was the founder of the Center for Non-Profit Corporations, which is a consulting firm, and a toxic-waste cleanup company. She held that post until 2008.

Wilson, who grew up in Burlington, New Jersey, and returned there in later years, served as Chair of the Burlington City Historic Preservation Commission, as Trustee of the Pinelands Preservation Alliance, as Trustee of the Whitesbog Preservation Trust, and as Trustee of Family Service of Burlington.

New Jersey General Assembly
Preceded by Constituency established	Member of the New Jersey General Assembly from the 22nd district January 8, 1974–January 13, 1976; Served alongside: Arnold D'Ambrosa	Succeeded by Donald DiFrancesco; William J. Maguire
