= Mayo Performing Arts Center =

Performing arts center in Morristown, New Jersey, United States

Coordinates: 40.79413°N 74.47814°W

- MPAC, The Morristown Community Theatre
- Interactive map of Mayo Performing Arts Center
- Address: 100 South Street; Morristown, New Jersey; United States
- Capacity: 1,319
- Type: Performing arts center

Construction
- Opened: 1937
- Architect: Walter Reade

Website
- www.mayoarts.org

The Mayo Performing Arts Center (MPAC) is a nonprofit multi-use performing arts center located in Morristown, New Jersey, United States.

== History ==
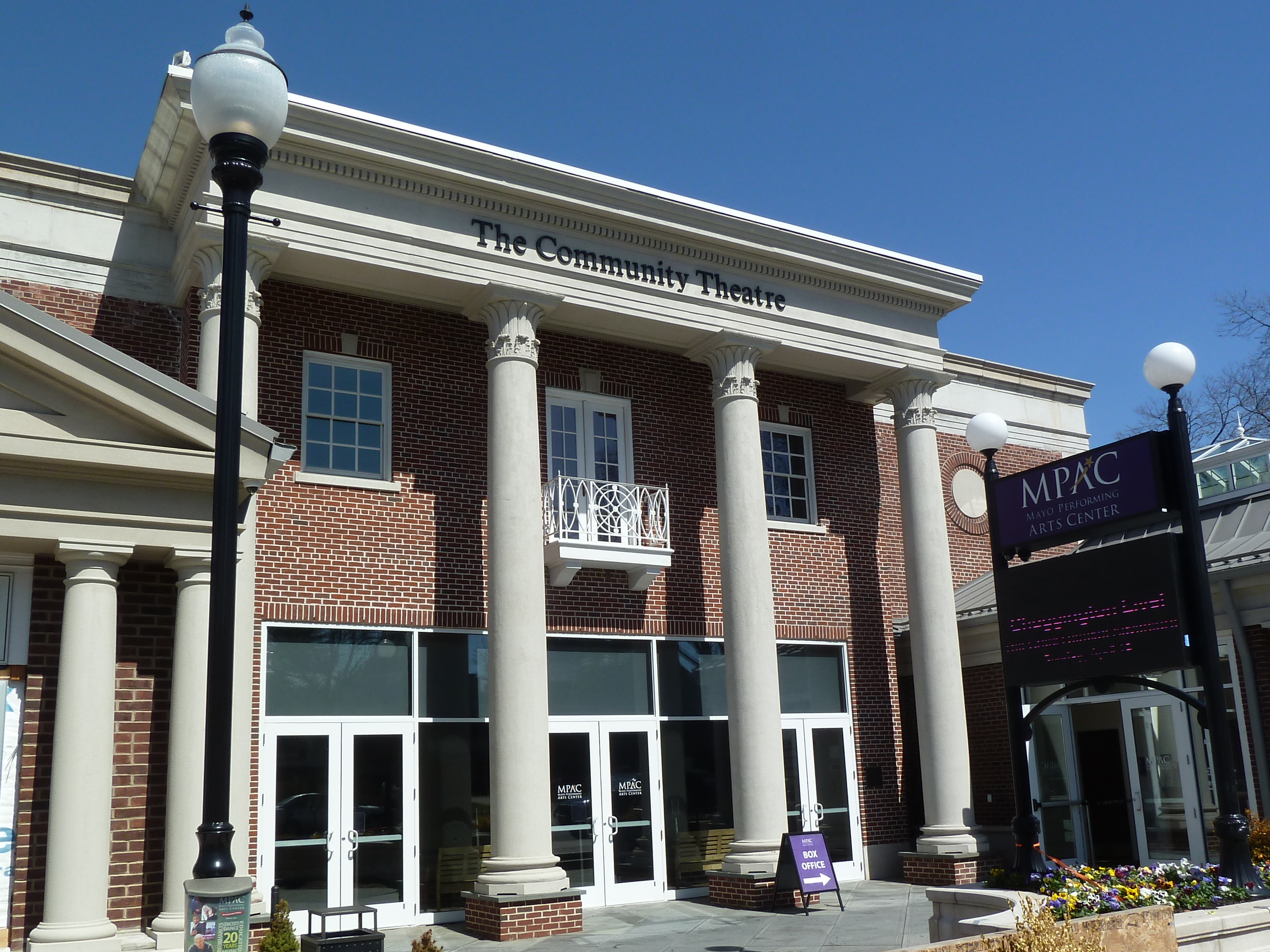
Entrance of the MPAC

The Community Theatre was built in 1937 and was once the crown jewel of Walter Reade's chain of movie theatres in New Jersey, opening on December 23, 1937, with the David O. Selznick film, Nothing Sacred. By the 1980s, the Theatre had fallen into disrepair and sat idle for nearly a decade.

In 1994, pianists Alexander Slobodyanik. and Laryssa Krupa proposed an arts festival in Morris County and recruited Valery Gergiev, who recognized the potential of the dilapidated theater as a performance venue. Don Jay and Linda Smith helped establish the organization as a nonprofit. Early support included grants from the Kirby and Geraldine R. Dodge foundations and Warner-Lambert.

In 1994, the Theatre reopened as a performing arts center with a gala performance featuring the Kirov Orchestra and pianist Alexander Slobodyanik.

In 2007, major renovations including the installation of an air conditioner enabled the venue to be open year round. A Liza Minnelli performance celebrated the reopening.

The upstairs balcony was renovated in 2011, with new restrooms, Art Gallery space and concessions.

In May 2011, the Theatre officially changed its name to Mayo Performing Arts Center, completing a three-year transition, honoring the leadership of Bud Mayo.

In 2014, renovations to the front of house were completed, which included a digital marquee, new box office, elevator to balcony level, upgraded and expanded restrooms and nor bar and concessions stands. The Starlight Room was renovated in 2016. In July 2016, the Theatre earned the distinction of Outstanding Historic Theatre by the League of Historic American Theatres.

== Notable Acts ==
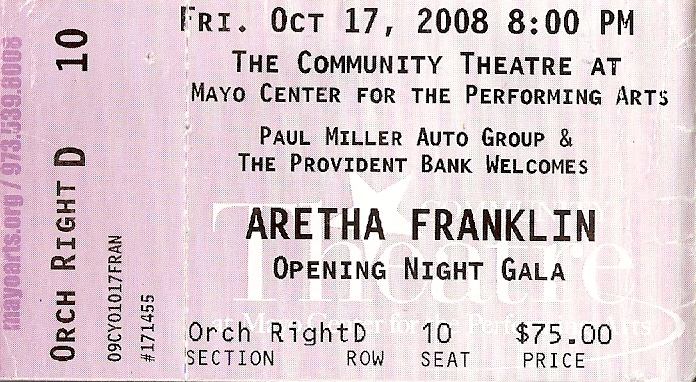
Aretha Franklin opened MPAC's '08-'09 Season

Music:

- 38 Special
- Air Supply
- Trey Anastasio
- Paul Anka
- Adam Ant
- America
- The Beach Boys
- Tony Bennett
- Blue Öyster Cult
- Jackson Browne
- Peter Cetera
- Judy Collins
- Chick Corea and Bela Fleck
- Christopher Cross
- Blues Traveler
- Boy George and Culture Club
- Dion
- Micky Dolenz
- Melissa Etheridge
- Foreigner
- Aretha Franklin
- Kenny G
- Art Garfunkel
- Arlo Guthrie
- Herman's Hermits
- Bruce Hornsby
- Engelbert Humperdinck
- Chris Isaak
- Boney James
- Jefferson Starship
- Jennifer Nettles
- B.B. King
- Gladys Knight
- Darlene Love
- The Manhattan Transfer
- Mannheim Steamroller
- The Marshall Tucker Band
- Meat Loaf (Nov 25, 1977)
- Randy Newman
- The Oak Ridge Boys
- Joan Osborne
- Donny and Marie Osmond
- Bernadette Peters
- The Righteous Brothers
- Leann Rimes
- Linda Ronstadt
- Todd Rundgren
- Trombone Shorty
- Mavis Staples
- Ringo Starr and His All Starr Band
- Ruben Studdard
- Peter Tork
- Rob Thomas
  - Three Dog Night
- Aaron Tveit
- Dionne Warwick
- Brian Wilson
- "Weird Al" Yankovic
- Yanni
- Dwight Yoakam
- Dweezil Zappa

Stand-Up

- Louie Anderson
- Dave Attell
- Lewis Black
- Wayne Brady
- Jim Breuer
- Cheech & Chong
- Andrew Dice Clay
- Craig Ferguson
- Kathy Griffin
- Marcello Hernandez
- Jay Leno
- Howie Mandel
- Norm Macdonald
- Tracy Morgan
- Kevin Nealon
- Bob Newhart
- Jackie Mason
- Hasan Minajh
- Jeff Ross
- Rita Rudner
- Bob Saget

Theater:

- RENT
- Stomp
- Wizard of Oz
- Elf the Musical
- Monty Python’s Spamalot
- Rodgers + Hammerstein’s Cinderella
- Reduced Shakespeare Company
- The Sound of Music Live!
- The Producers
- Ragtime the Musical
- Joseph and the Amazing Technicolor Dreamcoat
- The Mikado
- Mamma Mia!
- Evil Dead the Musical
- A Chorus Line
- Peppa Pig
- Come From Away
- TINA - The Tina Turner Musical

Speakers:

- Temple Grandin
- Carol Burnett
- Deepak Chopra
- John Cleese
- Drew Carey
- Anderson Cooper
- Cesar Millan
- David Sedaris
- Jane Fonda
- James Van Praagh
- John Kerry
- Rob Lowe

Tribute acts:

- Beatles
- Roy Orbison Hologram Tour
- Queen
- the Rat Pack
- Simon & Garfunkel

Special events:

- Big Apple Circus
- The Nutcracker by the New Jersey Ballet
- Price is Right Live!
- Whose Live Anyway?

== Transportation ==
A New Jersey Transit bus stop is located adjacent to the theatre. The theatre is approximately 0.3 miles from Morristown station.

== See also ==
- New Jersey music venues by capacity
