= Michael John Trotta =

American musical composer and conductor (born 1978)

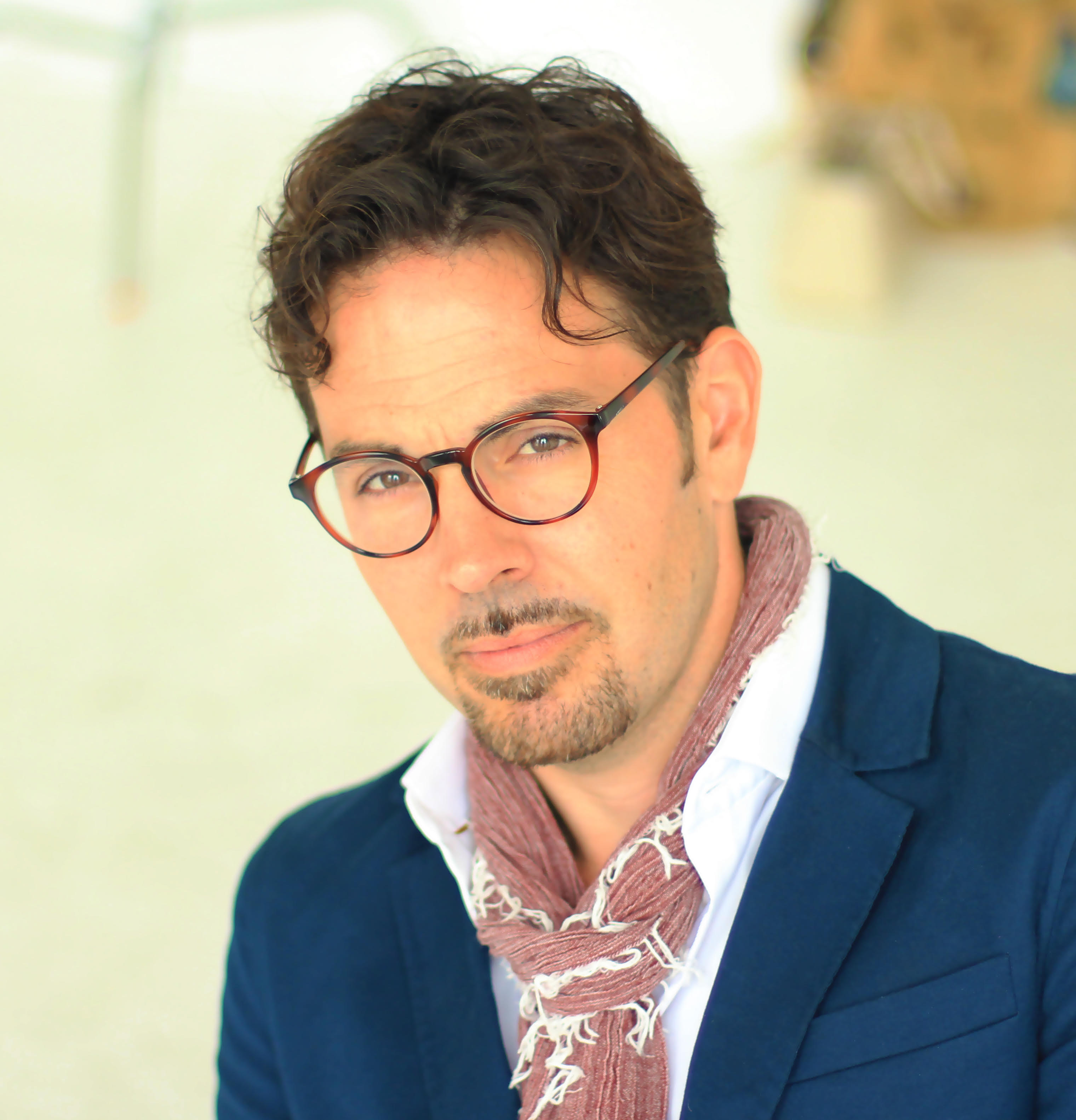

Background information
- Born: 1978 (age 47–48); Point Pleasant, New Jersey
- Genres: Classical, choral
- Occupations: Composer, conductor
- Instruments: Piano, voice, conducting
- Years active: 2000-present

Michael John Trotta (born 1978) is an American musical composer and conductor. He has appeared at Carnegie Hall three times since 2014.

== Biography ==
During his undergraduate career at Rowan University, Trotta studied voice and conducting and earned his Bachelor's of Music Degree in Music Education. After 10 years of full-time public school teaching, he earned his Master's Degree in Composition and Choral Conducting. He earned his Doctorate in Choral Conducting at Louisiana State University, where he studied with Kenneth Fulton. While at LSU he met his future wife, Rachel. After graduating, he taught at Rowan University, Oklahoma State University, and Virginia Wesleyan College.

In 2015, Trotta relocated to New York City to work as a full-time freelance Composer. Since that time, he has received several commissions, including the major work for choir and orchestra Seven Last Words', For a Breath of Ecstasy, and Gloria, the premiere of which he was invited to conduct at Carnegie Hall.

He was named Distinguished Composer & Conductor by Mid America Productions for the purpose of “fostering the creation, performance and growth of his music in America and Europe.

== Recordings ==
- Totus Tuus (2015)
- In the Bleak Midwinter (2016)
- Seven Last Words (2017)

== Works ==
=== Major works ===
==== Seven Last Words (Septem Verbum Ultima) ====
1. Father, Forgive Them
2. Today, You Will Be with Me
3. Behold Your Son
4. I Thirst
5. My God, Why Have You Abandoned Me?
6. Into Your Hands I Surrender My Soul
7. It is Finished

==== A Light Shines in the Darkness (SATB/keyboard/opt. Strings) ====
1. Do Not Stand at My Grave and Weep (Elizabeth Frye)
2. I Seek A Faith(Vachel Lindsay)
3. The Lord is My Shepherd(Psalm 23)
4. A Light Shines in the Darkness (Rabindranath Tagore)
5. Death Shall Be No More (John Donne)
6. I Saw a New Heaven (Revelation)
7. Even Death Itself(Virgil)
8. Deep Peace (Traditional Celtic Blessing)

==== For A Breath of Ecstasy – (SATB/oboe/strings) 31’ ====
(texts by Sara Teasdale)

1. Wealth Enough For Me
2. Peace Flows Into Me
3. Who Gave My Soul To Me
4. For You I Am Still
5. Spend All You Have On Loveliness
6. And I For You
7. Let Me Love

Gloria – (SATB/brass, organ and percussion or full orchestra) 14’

1. Gloria in excelsis Deo
2. Domine Deus, Rex caelestis,
3. Quoniam tu solus Sanctus

==== Magnificat – (SATB/chamber orchestra or full orchestra) 40’ ====
1. Magnificat anima mea Dominum 1 (My soul glorifies the Lord)
2. Quia fecit (He has done great things for me)
3. Ave rosa sine spinis (Rose without thorns)
4. Fecit Potentiam (He has shown strength)
5. Ecce ancilla (I am the servant)
6. Esurientes (The hungry shall be filled)
7. Sicut locutus est (As he promised)

Requiem – (SATB/organ or chamber orchestra) 40'

1. Introit and Kyrie
2. Dies irae
3. Offertory et Hostias
4. Sanctus
5. Pie Jesu
6. Agnus Dei
7. Lux Aeterna
8. Libera Me
9. Et Mors Ultra Non Erit
10. In Paradisum
