= Nancy Chard =

American politician (1933–2010)

Member of the Vermont Senate from the Windham district
- In office January 4, 1995 – January 8, 2003
- Preceded by: Jan Backus
- Succeeded by: Roderick M. Gander

Member of the Vermont House of Representatives from the Windham 2-3 district
- In office January 9, 1991 – January 4, 1995
- Preceded by: Julie A. Peterson
- Succeeded by: Thomas W. Costello

Personal details
- Born: July 14, 1933 Point Pleasant, New Jersey, U.S.
- Died: February 18, 2010 (aged 76) Townshend, Vermont, U.S.
- Party: Democratic

Nancy Chard (July 14, 1933 – February 18, 2010) was an American politician who served in the Vermont House of Representatives from the Windham 2-3 district from 1991 to 1995 and in the Vermont Senate from the Windham district from 1995 to 2003.

She died on February 18, 2010, in Townshend, Vermont, at age 76.
