= Point Pleasant Borough High School =

High school in Ocean County, New Jersey, US

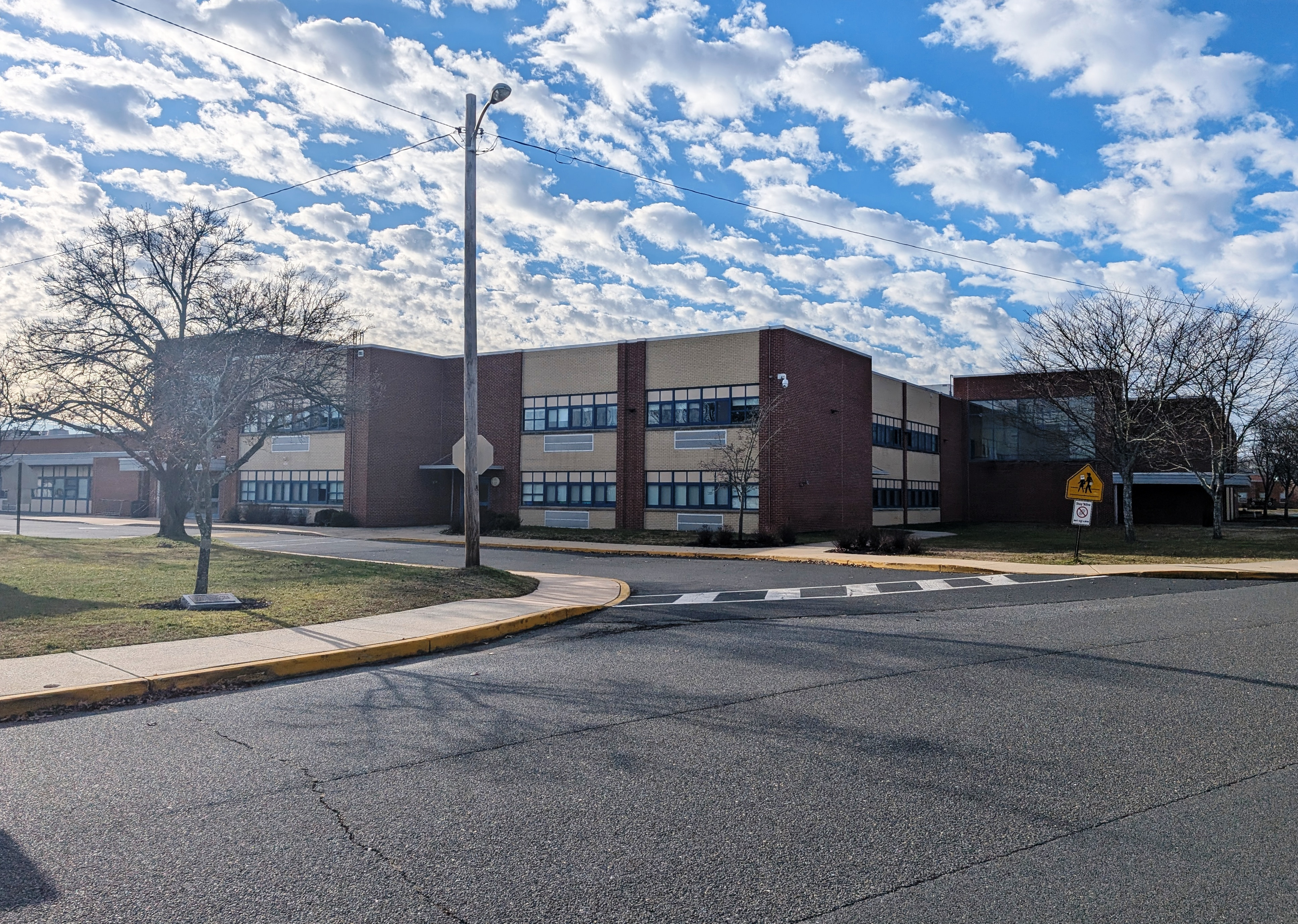

Location
- 808 Laura Herbert Drive; Point Pleasant, Ocean County, New Jersey 08742; United States; 40.080057°N 74.07133°W

Information
- Type: Public high school
- School district: Point Pleasant School District
- NCES School ID: 341329004692
- Principal: Kurt Karcich
- Faculty: 78.0 FTEs
- Grades: 9-12
- Enrollment: 831 (as of 2024–25)
- Student to teacher ratio: 10.7:1
- Colors: Black and gold
- Athletics conference: Shore Conference
- Team name: Panthers
- Website: ppbhs.pointpleasant.k12.nj.us

Point Pleasant Borough High School is a four-year comprehensive community public high school located on Laura Herbert Drive in Point Pleasant in Ocean County, in the U.S. state of New Jersey. The school serves students in ninth through twelfth grades, operating as the lone secondary school of the Point Pleasant School District. The mascot is the panther, and the school colors are black and gold.

As of the 2024–25 school year, the school had an enrollment of 831 students and 78.0 classroom teachers (on an FTE basis), for a student–teacher ratio of 10.7:1. There were 113 students (13.6% of enrollment) eligible for free lunch and 18 (2.2% of students) eligible for reduced-cost lunch.

== Awards, recognition and rankings ==
The school was the 98th-ranked public high school in New Jersey out of 339 schools statewide in New Jersey Monthly magazine's September 2014 cover story on the state's "Top Public High Schools", using a new ranking methodology. The school had been ranked 154th in the state of 328 schools in 2012, after being ranked 133rd in 2010 out of 322 schools listed. The magazine ranked the school 172nd in 2008 out of 316 schools. The school was ranked 117th in the magazine's September 2006 issue, which surveyed 316 schools across the state. Schooldigger.com ranked the school tied for 64th out of 381 public high schools statewide in its 2011 rankings (an increase of 132 positions from the 2010 ranking) which were based on the combined percentage of students classified as proficient or above proficient on the mathematics (89.8%) and language arts literacy (97.6%) components of the High School Proficiency Assessment (HSPA).

== Athletics ==
The Point Pleasant Borough High School Panthers compete in Division B South of the Shore Conference, an athletic conference comprised of public and private high schools in Monmouth and Ocean counties along the Jersey Shore. The conference operates under the jurisdiction of the New Jersey State Interscholastic Athletic Association (NJSIAA). With 598 students in grades 10-12, the school was classified by the NJSIAA for the 2019–20 school year as Group II for most athletic competition purposes, which included schools with an enrollment of 486 to 758 students in that grade range. The school was classified by the NJSIAA as Group II South for football for 2024–2026, which included schools with 514 to 685 students.

The school participates in a joint ice hockey team with Jackson Memorial High School in which Jackson Liberty High School is the host school / lead agency. The co-op program operates under agreements scheduled to expire at the end of the 2023–24 school year.

The boys' baseball team won the Central Jersey Group I state title in 1966.

The boys' soccer team won the Group II state championship in 1968 (defeating runner-up Verona High School in the championship game) and 1972 (vs. Lawrence High School). The 1968 team won the Group II title with a 2–0 win against Verona in the championship game played at Hightstown High School. The 1972 team finished the season with a record of 18-2 after defeating three-time returning champion Lawrence High School by a score of 2-0 in the Group II tournament final played at Glassboro State College.

The football team has won the South Jersey Group II state sectional championship in 1977, 1978 and 2005. The 1977 team finished the season with a 9–2 record after winning the South Jersey Group II state sectional title with a 7-0 victory against Salem High School in the playoff finals. The 1978 team won the program's second consecutive South Jersey Group II title with a 21–16 win against Maple Shade High School in the championship game. The team won the 2005 title with a 43–0 win against Camden High School in the playoff finals, finishing the season with a record of 12-0.

The 1996 girls' basketball team became the first Ocean County team to win a state title in the sport when it took the Group II state championship, defeating James Caldwell High School by a score of 42-39 in the tournament final before advancing to the Tournament of Champions as the sixth seed and falling by 64-36 in the quarterfinals to third-seeded Notre Dame High School to finish the season with a 21–7 record.

The boys' wrestling team the South Jersey Group II state sectional championship in 2007 and 2018. The team won the 2007 South Jersey, Group II sectional title with a 31–26 win over Cinnaminson High School.

== Marching band ==
The marching band was the Tournament of Bands Atlantic Coast Invitational Class A winners in Group 3 in 2019 and 2023.

== Administration ==
The school's principal is Kurt Karcich. His core administration team includes two vice principals.

== MRSA ==
In October 2007, a female on the soccer team was diagnosed with Methicillin-resistant Staphylococcus aureus (MRSA). The school, one of several in the area to experience these infections, was reopened after classrooms and other portions of the school were disinfected.

== Notable alumni ==
- Andrew R. Ciesla (born 1953), Member of the New Jersey Senate who represented the 10th Legislative District.
- Robert DeLeo (born 1966), bass player, songwriter, and backing vocalist for the rock band Stone Temple Pilots.
- Kelsey Haycook (born 1993, class of 2011), soccer player who played for the Portland Thorns FC
- Jacqui Kapinowski (born 1962), two-time American Paralympian who competed in wheelchair curling at the 2010 Winter Paralympics and in rowing at the 2016 Summer Paralympics.
- Glenn Kirschner (born 1961, class of 1979), attorney and former U.S. Army prosecutor who is legal analyst for NBC News / MSNBC.
- Ryan Malleck (born 1993), American football tight end who played in the NFL for the Houston Texans.
- Peter Nowalk (class of 1996), television writer and producer, best known as the creator of the legal thriller, How to Get Away with Murder.
- Diamond Dallas Page (born 1956 as Page Falkinburg), former professional wrestler and actor.
- Christie Pearce (born 1975), USA soccer player. As a senior, she became the first person to lead the Shore Conference in scoring in soccer, basketball and field hockey.
- Kurt Pellegrino (born 1979), mixed martial arts fighter.
- Soraya (1969–2006), singer/songwriter.
