= Point Pleasant School District =

School district in Ocean County, New Jersey, US

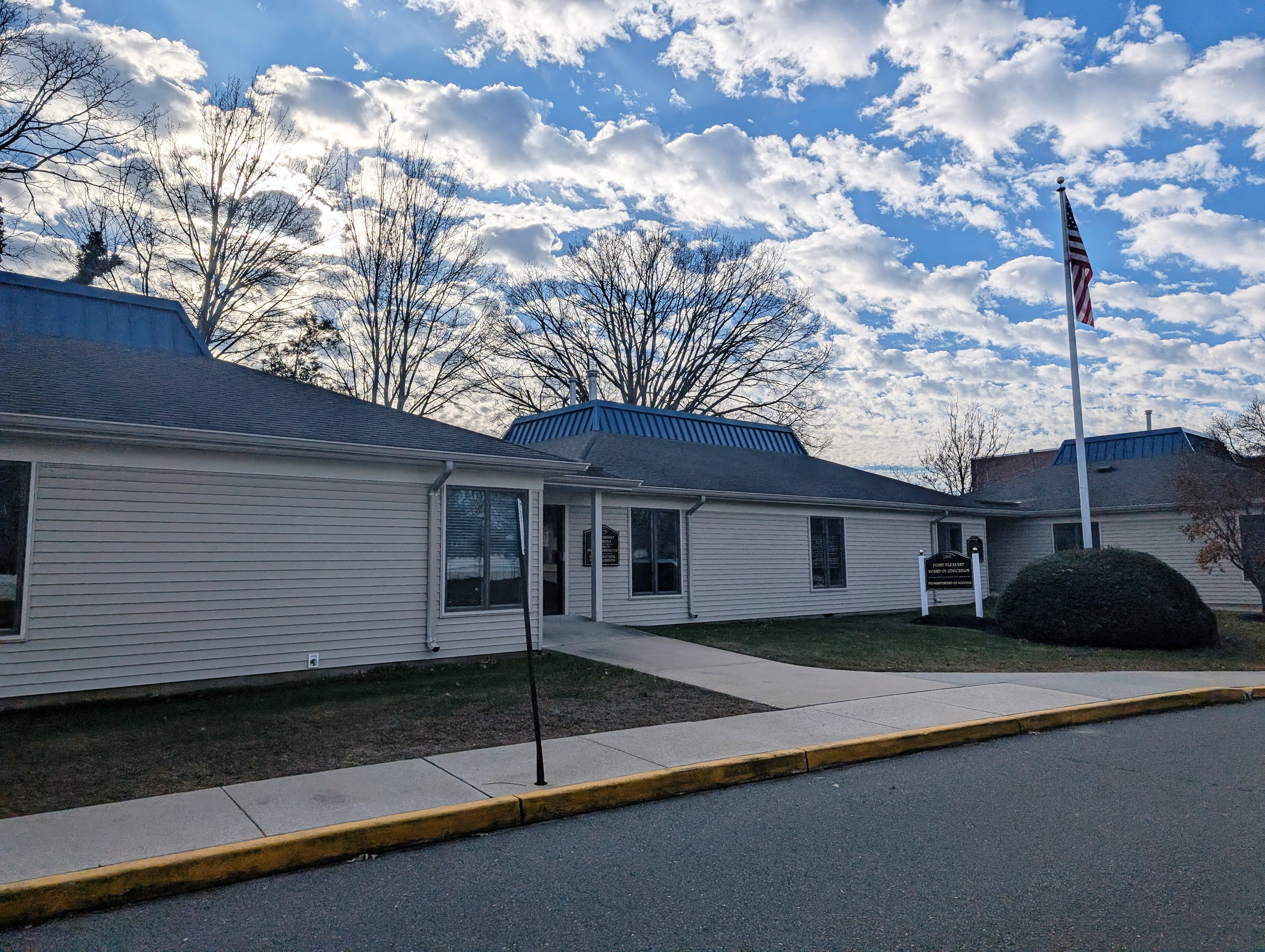
- District offices

Address
- 2100 Panther Path Point Pleasant, Ocean County, New Jersey, 08742; United States
- Coordinates: 40.078563°N 74.06926°W

District information
- Grades: PreK-12
- Superintendent: Adam L. Angelozzi
- Business administrator: Christina Fessler
- Schools: 4

Students and staff
- Enrollment: 2,659 (as of 2023–24)
- Faculty: 240.6 FTEs
- Student–teacher ratio: 11.1:1

Other information
- District Factor Group: FG
- Website: www.pointpleasant.k12.nj.us
Ind.	Per pupil	District spending	Rank (*)	K-12 average	%± vs. average
1A	Total Spending	$14,705	3	$18,891	−22.2%
1	Budgetary Cost	12,118	8	14,783	−18.0%
2	Classroom Instruction	7,053	8	8,763	−19.5%
6	Support Services	1,890	19	2,392	−21.0%
8	Administrative Cost	1,351	15	1,485	−9.0%
10	Operations & Maintenance	1,385	16	1,783	−22.3%
13	Extracurricular Activities	383	34	268	42.9%
16	Median Teacher Salary	60,513	20	64,043
Data from NJDoE 2014 Taxpayers' Guide to Education Spending. *Of K-12 districts with 1,800-3,500 students. Lowest spending=1; Highest=68

The Point Pleasant School District is a comprehensive community public school district that serves students in pre-kindergarten through twelfth grade from Point Pleasant, in Ocean County, in the U.S. state of New Jersey.

As of the 2023–24 school year, the district, comprised of four schools, had an enrollment of 2,659 students and 240.6 classroom teachers (on an FTE basis), for a student–teacher ratio of 11.1:1.

The district had been classified by the New Jersey Department of Education as being in District Factor Group "FG", the fourth-highest of eight groupings. District Factor Groups organize districts statewide to allow comparison by common socioeconomic characteristics of the local districts. From lowest socioeconomic status to highest, the categories are A, B, CD, DE, FG, GH, I and J.

== Schools ==
Schools in the district (with 2023–24 enrollment data from the National Center for Education Statistics) are:

Elementary schools

- Nellie F. Bennett Elementary School with 708 students in grades PreK–5
  - James E. Karaba, principal
- Ocean Road Elementary School with 481 students in PreK–5
  - Sheila Buck, principal

Middle school

- Memorial Middle School with 593 students in 6–8
  - Matthew Rusnak, principal

High school

- Point Pleasant Borough High School with 856 students in grades 9–12
  - Kurt Karcich, principal

== Administration ==
Core members of the district's administration are:

- Adam L. Angelozzi, superintendent
- Christina Fessler, business administrator and board secretary

== Board of education ==
The district's board of education, comprised of seven members, sets policy and oversees the fiscal and educational operation of the district through its administration. As a Type II school district, the board's trustees are elected directly by voters to serve three-year terms of office on a staggered basis, with either two three seats up for election each year held (since 2012) as part of the November general election. The board appoints a superintendent to oversee the district's day-to-day operations and a business administrator to supervise the business functions of the district.
