= A. Dale "Bud" Mayo =

American business executive and digital cinema entrepreneur

A. Dale “Bud” Mayo
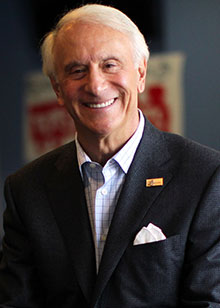
- Born: A. Dale Mayo; Brooklyn, New York, U.S.
- Education: New York University
- Occupations: Chairman Cofounder New Vision Theatres and New Vision Entertainment
- Website: www.newvisiontheatres.com

A. Dale “Bud” Mayo is an American business executive and digital cinema entrepreneur. He is the CEO business advisory firm A. Dale Mayo & Associates, Inc., and also served as chairman of New Vision Entertainment Group, LLC. and chairman of the Board of Meta Media Tech LLC. Earlier in his career, he was the founder of Digital Cinema Destinations Corp. and has served as chairman and chief executive officer since its inception in July 2010.

Mayo retired as a board chair of B2B security company, Riskband/Whereable Technologies, and he has founded and operated several entertainment and tech companies over a more than entrepreneurial 40 years following stints at IBM and Wall Street.

== Early life and education ==
Mayo is from Brooklyn and graduated from Stuyvesant High School and New York University.

== Career ==
Mayo is best known as president and CEO of A. Dale Mayo & Associates, Inc. business advisory services, which he founded in 1969.

== New Vision Cinemas. Co-founder and non executive chairman April 2017-November, 2019 ==
Carmike Cinemas: President, Alternative Programming 2014–2016 when Carmike was acquired by AMC.

=== Digiplex ===
Bud Mayo served as the company's founder, chairman and CEO from 2010 until 2014, when the company merged into Carmike Cinemas.

Digital Cinema Destinations Corp. is also known by its brand, Digiplex Destinations. The company equipped its movie theaters with digital technology to host alternative content like live sports events, concerts, conferences, operas, video games, auctions and fashion shows in addition to major motion pictures. Digiplex is also a founding partner in DigiNext, a specialty content venture featuring curated content from film festivals around the world.

Digiplex operates 20 cinemas and 192 screens spanning the country from the Mid-Atlantic region to California. On May 15, 2014, an announcement was made that Carmike Cinemas intends to purchase 100% of Digiplex. The June 12, 2014 issue of Variety lauded the expansion of Digiplex's successful Alternative Programming into the expanded platform of the Carmike circuit.

Since the earliest stages of the exhibition industries transition from film to digital, Mayo has been an outspoken evangelizer about the benefits that Digital Cinema brings to operators and audiences alike. He has been a strong advocate of "Day-Part Programming", that would align the technological capabilities of Digital Cinema with the varying audiences that tend to visit theaters throughout the typical course of the year.

=== Cinedigm ===
Mayo was the founder, chairman, president and chief executive officer of Cinedigm, a pioneer in the digital cinema industry, from April 2000 until his retirement in June 2010.

During his tenure, Cinedigm completed an IPO in 2003 and financings in excess of $600 million. Cinedigm lead the way for the transition from film to digital, a revolutionary shift for the entire motion picture industry. Cinedigm continues to provide expanded content for moviegoers as well as enabling software and integration services for producers, distributors, and exhibitors.

=== Early career ===
From 1976 to 1993, Mayo was the founder, chief executive officer and sole shareholder of Clearview Leasing Corporation which completed more than $200 million in equipment lease transactions. He began his career with IBM as a computer salesman in 1965 and later co-founded more than a dozen computer services companies. During the 1970s, he served in various corporate finance positions on Wall Street.

In recognition of his contributions to the motion picture exhibition industry, Mayo was inducted into the film exhibition Hall of Fame at the industry's Show East conference in October 2010 and earned a Telly Award in 2009. He was recipient of the Ernst & Young’s 2006 Regional Entrepreneur of the Year Award and has the distinction of being nominated a second time for the 2014 Entrepreneur of the Year. In 2017 he was inducted into the Box Office Hall of Fame. In 2018 he received the Paul Rogers Leadership Award from the Geneva Convention. He has served on the board of advisors of the Motion Picture Pioneers/Will Rogers Foundation for more than 25 years.

== Personal life ==
Mayo lives in Point Pleasant, New Jersey Since 1994, he has been instrumental in the development of the Community Theater of Morristown mayoarts.org serving as a board member and holding various positions including member of the Finance Committee, president/CEO and chairman. In recognition of his contributions, the Community Theater was renamed the Mayo Performing Arts Center in 2008. aka MPAC. Mayo has also served as a trustee of the Ocean Medical Center Foundation.
