= Donald DiFrancesco =

American politician

- DiFrancesco in 1992

51st Governor of New Jersey
- In office January 31, 2001 – January 8, 2002
- Preceded by: Christine Todd Whitman
- Succeeded by: John Farmer Jr. (acting)

110th President of the New Jersey Senate
- In office January 14, 1992 – January 8, 2002
- Preceded by: John A. Lynch Jr.
- Succeeded by: Robert E. Littell (acting)

Minority Leader of the New Jersey Senate
- In office January 12, 1982 – January 8, 1985
- Preceded by: Barry T. Parker
- Succeeded by: S. Thomas Gagliano

Member of the New Jersey Senate from the 22nd district
- In office November 13, 1979 – January 8, 2002
- Preceded by: Peter McDonough
- Succeeded by: Joseph Suliga

Member of the New Jersey General Assembly from the 22nd district
- In office January 13, 1976 – November 13, 1979
- Preceded by: Arnold D'Ambrosa; Betty Wilson
- Succeeded by: Bob Franks

Personal details
- Born: Donald Thomas DiFrancesco; November 20, 1944 (age 81) Scotch Plains, New Jersey, U.S.
- Party: Republican
- Spouse: Diane DiFrancesco
- Education: Pennsylvania State University (BS); Seton Hall University (JD)

Donald Thomas DiFrancesco (born November 20, 1944) is a retired American politician who served as the 51st governor of New Jersey from 2001 to 2002. (Note: DiFrancesco originally served as Acting Governor of New Jersey. In 2006, he was retroactively declared the 51st Governor of New Jersey by a law of the New Jersey Legislature.) He succeeded Christine Todd Whitman after her resignation to become Administrator of the Environmental Protection Agency. A member of the Republican Party, DiFrancesco previously was President of the New Jersey Senate from 1992 to 2002.

== Education and early career ==
Born in Scotch Plains, New Jersey, DiFrancesco attended Scotch Plains-Fanwood High School, where he was senior class president. He graduated in 1966 with a Bachelor's Degree from Penn State University in business, and was awarded a J.D. degree from Seton Hall University School of Law in 1969. He served as Scotch Plains Municipal Attorney.

== New Jersey Legislature ==
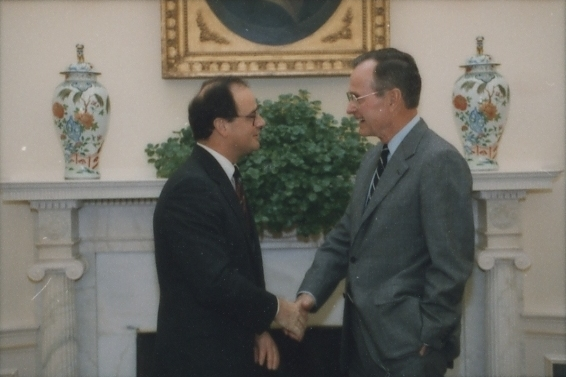
DiFrancesco with President George H. W. Bush in 1992

DiFrancesco was elected to the New Jersey General Assembly in 1975. He won a contested Republican primary, defeating former Assemblyman Arthur Manner by 1,067 votes. He defeated incumbent Democratic Assemblywoman Betty Wilson by 2,387 votes. He was re-elected in 1977 by a margin of 4,709 votes.

DiFrancesco won a 1979 special election for State Senator when the Republican incumbent, Peter J. McDonough resigned. He defeated his running mate, Assemblyman William J. Maguire at the Union County Republican Convention; in general election, he defeated Springfield Mayor Joanne Rajoppi by 6,917 votes. He was re-elected in 1981, 1983, 1987, 1991, 1993 and 1997.

DiFrancesco ran for Senate Minority Leader after the 1981 elections, eschewing the traditional rotation of leadership posts. He defeated James P. Vreeland (R-Towaco), who had served as Assistant Minority Leader during the previous session. DiFrancesco's attempt to win GOP control of the upper house in 1983 was unsuccessful. After serving nearly three years as Senate Minority Leader, S. Thomas Gagliano succeeded DiFrancesco as Leader on January 8, 1985. After Republicans won a majority of seats in the 1991 election, DiFrancesco used a similar strategy and beat the sitting Minority Leader, John H. Dorsey, to win the Senate presidency.

== Governor ==
DiFrancesco, a state senator representing the Scotch Plains area, became acting governor when fellow Republican Christine Todd Whitman resigned from office to join the administration of newly elected President George W. Bush.

At the time of Whitman's resignation, the New Jersey Constitution stipulated that the Senate president retains that position while also serving as acting governor. This made DiFrancesco, in his own words, the most powerful New Jersey governor ever (and perhaps the most powerful governor ever) because he was the leader of both the State Senate and executive branch simultaneously. This distinction was shared by later acting governors Robert E. Littell, John O. Bennett and Richard Codey.

DiFrancesco's title was officially Acting Governor until it was changed retroactively by legislation passed on January 10, 2006, which classified anyone who, after January 1, 2001, acted as governor for longer than 180 days as a full governor.

== 2001 election ==
DiFrancesco initially planned to run for a full term as governor in the 2001 election. Democratic Woodbridge Mayor Jim McGreevey and Republican Jersey City Mayor Bret Schundler also sought the governorship. Polls showed DiFrancesco with a commanding lead over the more conservative Schundler in the primary, but trailing McGreevey (although performing better against him than Schundler) with a large number of undecided voters. DiFrancesco abruptly withdrew from the race in April 2001 after a number of unfavorable news stories emerged concerning his past legal and business dealings. A report in The New York Times suggested that the media criticism took a heavy toll on DiFrancesco, who had never before been subjected to the intense scrutiny of a statewide campaign, and his family, ultimately prompting his withdrawal. Under New Jersey law, a candidate can designate a replacement to appear on the ballot in the event of his/her withdrawal. DiFrancesco designated former Representative Bob Franks, who had only narrowly lost to Jon Corzine in a 2000 Senate race despite being massively outspent by Corzine in a year in which Democrats gained four seats in the Senate. However, despite receiving widespread support from the New Jersey Republican establishment, Franks was soundly defeated by Schundler in the Republican primary, who went on to lose to McGreevey in the general election by a wide margin.

=== Approval ratings ===
An August 7, 2001, Quinnipiac University Polling Institute poll showed Donald DiFrancesco's approval ratings at 54%, but what was remarkable about that poll is that it showed he had a 48% approval rating among Democrats.

== Controversies ==
DiFrancesco's public service and subsequent career have been the subject of media scrutiny regarding his business and legal dealings. The New York Times reported that while serving as the township attorney for Scotch Plains, DiFrancesco was faulted for an ethics violation concerning a conflict of interest between his public role and private legal practice. The newspaper also reported that in 1996, a prominent New Jersey developer aided DiFrancesco by providing him with $225,000 to pay off an outstanding legal judgment.

In 2001, while serving as Acting Governor, DiFrancesco's nominee for New Jersey Treasurer, Isabel Miranda, withdrew from consideration after reports emerged that she was fired from Citibank after using her expense account to pay for thousands of dollars' worth of personal trips while having an extramarital affair with a co-worker in California.

DiFrancesco was sued for sexual harassment by an employee of his law firm in 2007. The lawsuit was settled in 2008.

In 2011, DiFrancesco paid a $4,650 fine to the New Jersey Election Law Enforcement Commission to settle a campaign finance violation investigation and returned almost $10,000 in excess contributions..

In 2017, DiFrancesco resigned from his position as Chair of University Hospital in Newark after it was revealed that he had hired a female friend for a no-show job.

== Current activities ==
DiFrancesco presently serves on the Commerce Bancorp board of directors and is a partner in a law firm. He resides with his wife and children in Warren Township, New Jersey.

In August 2011, there was a feud between New Jersey Governor Christie and New York City Mayor Michael Bloomberg over whether DiFrancesco would be invited to the tenth anniversary of the September 11th attacks ceremony in Lower Manhattan, since DiFrancesco was governor during the attacks.

== Notes ==
New Jersey Senate
Preceded by Barry T. Parker	Minority Leader of the New Jersey Senate; 1982–1985	Succeeded by S. Thomas Gagliano
Political offices
Preceded by John A. Lynch Jr.	President of the New Jersey Senate; 1992–2002	Succeeded by Robert E. Littell; Acting
Preceded by Christine Todd Whitman	Governor of New Jersey; 2001–2002	Succeeded by John Farmer Jr. Acting
U.S. order of precedence (ceremonial)
Preceded by Christine Todd Whitman as Former Governor	Order of precedence of the United States	Succeeded by Jim McGreevey as Former Governor
