= Les Sept Paroles du Christ sur la Croix =

Les Sept Paroles du Christ sur la Croix (The seven words of Christ on the Cross) is a musical setting of sayings of Jesus on the cross by César Franck, composed in 1859.

The work was never performed during Franck's lifetime and was only discovered in 1955, when the University of Liège acquired an autograph score from a private owner. The work's structure resembles Franck's Les Béatitudes, consisting of a prologue followed by individual movements setting sayings, or in this case sometimes single phrases, of Jesus.

== Performances and recordings ==
- Franck: Les Sept Paroles du Christ sur la Croix. Domine, non secundum. Orchestre du Domaine Musical, Choeur Henri Duparc, Jean-Paul Salanne. Musique en Wallonie - MEW0318
- Franck: Les Sept Paroles du Christ sur la Croix. With Gounod Les sept paroles de N.S. Jesus-Christ sur la croix Ensemble Vocal de Lausanne, Michel Corboz. Mirare 2010
