= Ryan Malleck =

American football player (born 1993)

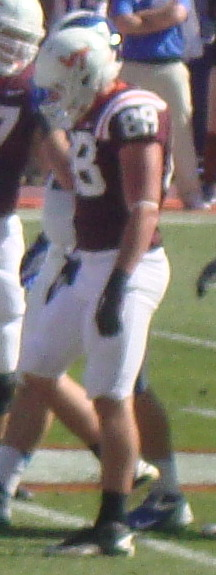
- Malleck with Virginia Tech in 2012

No. 88
- Position: Tight end

Personal information
- Born: July 22, 1993 (age 33); Teaneck, New Jersey, U.S.
- Listed height: 6 ft 4 in (1.93 m)
- Listed weight: 249 lb (113 kg)

Career information
- High school: Point Pleasant Borough (Point Pleasant, New Jersey)
- College: Virginia Tech
- NFL draft: 2016: undrafted

Career history
- New York Giants (2016)*; Pittsburgh Steelers (2017)*; Baltimore Ravens (2017)*; Houston Texans (2017); Pittsburgh Steelers (2018)
- * Offseason or practice squad member only

Career NFL statistics
- Receptions: 1
- Receiving yards: 3
- Stats at Pro Football Reference

Ryan John Malleck (born July 22, 1993) is an American former professional football player who was a tight end in the National Football League (NFL). He played college football for the Virginia Tech Hokies.

Born in Teaneck, New Jersey, Malleck grew up on the Jersey Shore in Point Pleasant as a fan of the New York Giants. He played football at Point Pleasant Borough High School.

== Professional career ==
=== New York Giants ===
Malleck signed with the New York Giants as an undrafted free agent on May 6, 2016. He was waived/injured by the Giants on August 30, and placed on injured reserve. Malleck was released with an injury settlement on September 3.

=== Pittsburgh Steelers ===
On February 22, 2017, Malleck signed with the Pittsburgh Steelers. He was waived by the Steelers on May 16.

=== Baltimore Ravens ===
On June 6, 2017, Malleck signed with the Baltimore Ravens. He was waived on September 2, and was re-signed to the Ravens' practice squad the next day. Malleck was released on September 12, but was re-signed on September 27. Malleck was released again on October 10.

=== Houston Texans ===
On November 29, 2017, Malleck was signed to the Houston Texans' practice squad. He was promoted to the active roster on December 23.

On April 30, 2018, Malleck was waived by the Texans.

=== Pittsburgh Steelers (second stint) ===
On June 5, 2018, Malleck signed with the Steelers on a one-year contract. He was waived/injured on August 2, and was placed on injured reserve. Malleck was released by Pittsburgh on November 20.
