= Point Pleasant, New Jersey =

Borough in Ocean County, New Jersey, US

- Borough
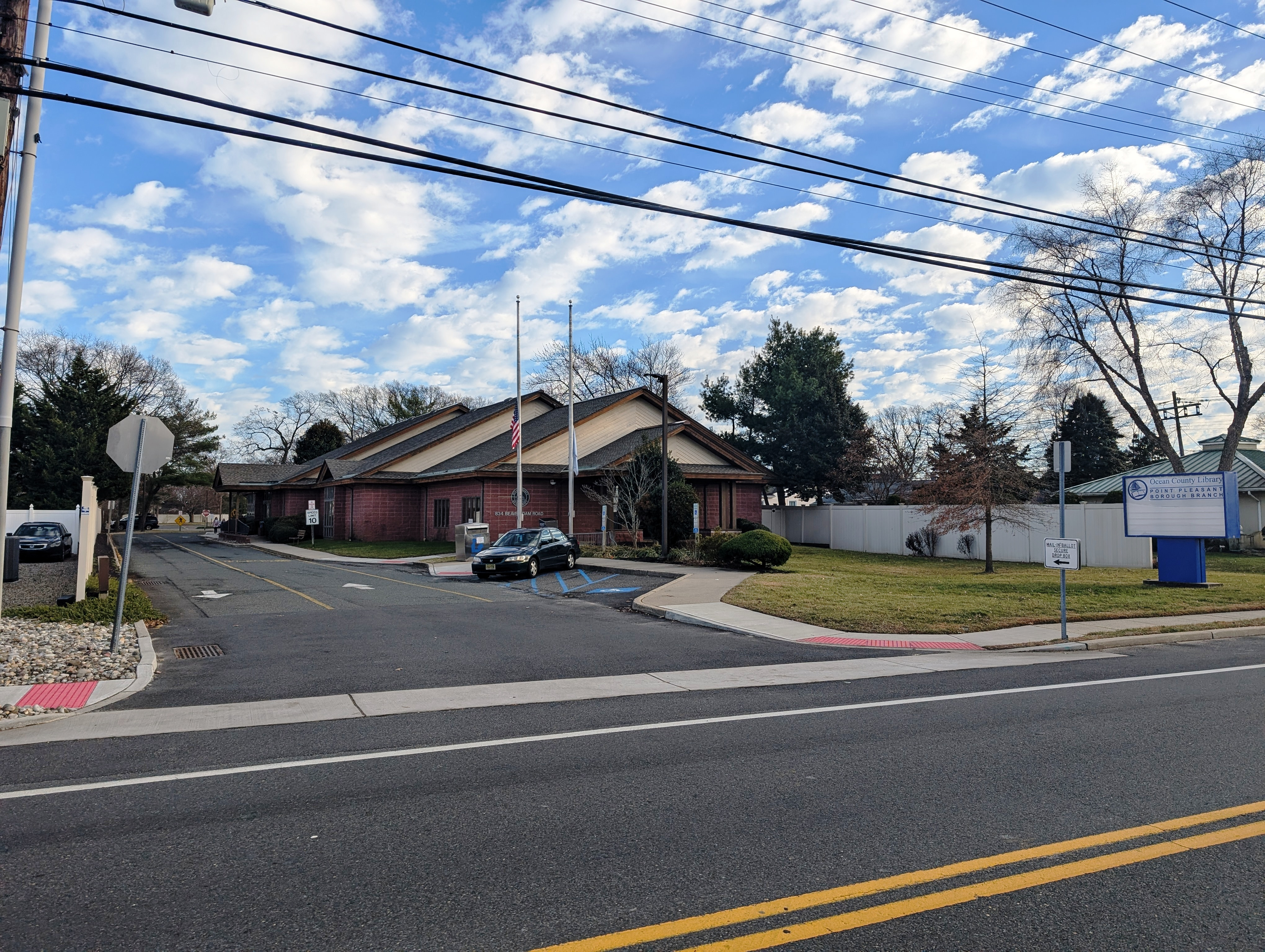
- Point Pleasant Borough Branch of the Ocean County Library

- Flag Seal

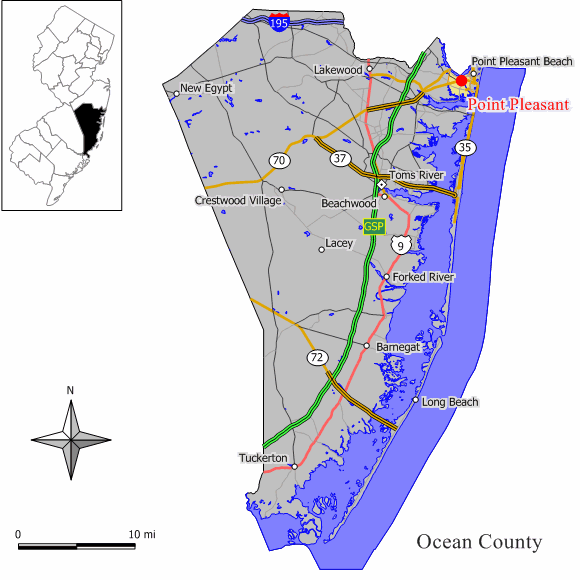
- Map of Point Pleasant in Ocean County. Inset: Location of Ocean County highlighted in the State of New Jersey.

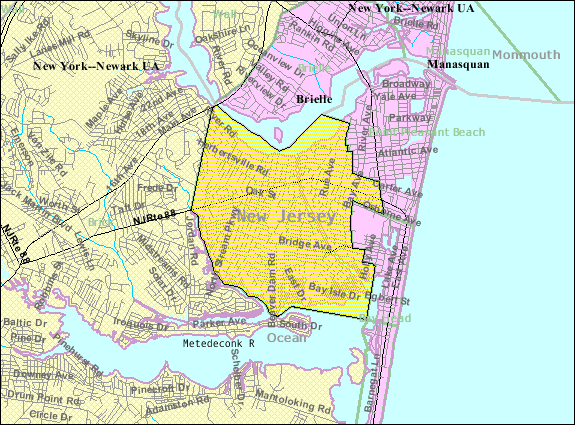
- Census Bureau map of Point Pleasant, New Jersey

- Location in Ocean County Location in New Jersey Location in the United States
- Coordinates: 40.077748°N 74.069921°W
- Country: United States
- State: New Jersey
- County: Ocean
- Incorporated: May 19, 1920

Government
  - Type: Borough
  - Body: Borough Council
  - Mayor: Robert A. Sabosik (R, term ends December 31, 2026)
  - Administrator: Frank Pannucci Jr.
  - Municipal clerk: Antoinette Jones

Area
  - Total: 4.17 sq mi (10.79 km^{2})
  - Land: 3.49 sq mi (9.04 km^{2})
  - Water: 0.67 sq mi (1.74 km^{2}) 16.16%
  - Rank: 292nd of 565 in state 15th of 33 in county
- Elevation: 13 ft (4.0 m)

Population (2020)
  - Total: 18,941
  - Estimate (2023): 19,429
  - Rank: 145th of 565 in state 11th of 33 in county
  - Density: 5,425.7/sq mi (2,094.9/km^{2})
  - Rank: 101st of 565 in state 2nd of 33 in county
- Time zone: UTC−05:00 (Eastern (EST))
  - Summer (DST): UTC−04:00 (Eastern (EDT))
- ZIP Code: 08742
- Area code: 732
- FIPS code: 3402959880
- GNIS feature ID: 0885357
- Website: ptboro.com

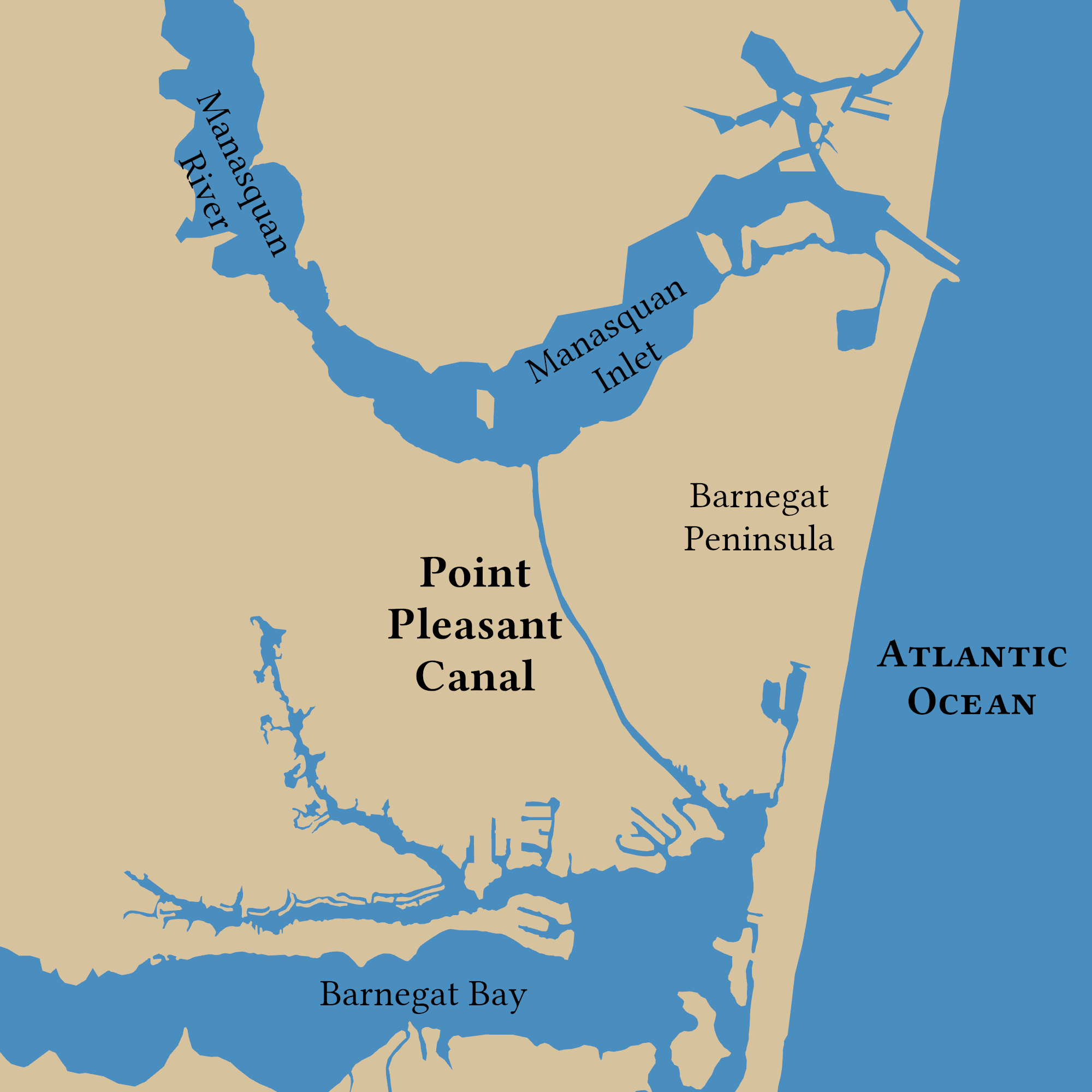
Schematic illustration of Point Pleasant Canal

Point Pleasant is a borough situated on the Jersey Shore, in northern Ocean County, in the U.S. state of New Jersey. As of the 2020 United States census, the borough's population was 18,941, an increase of 549 (+3.0%) from the 2010 census count of 18,392, which in turn reflected a decline of 914 (−4.7%) from the 19,306 counted at the 2000 census.

The borough is a Jersey Shore community situated on the Barnegat Peninsula, a long, narrow barrier peninsula that divides the Barnegat Bay from the Atlantic Ocean at the Manasquan Inlet; the borough derives its name from this location.

Point Pleasant was incorporated as a borough by an act of the New Jersey Legislature on April 21, 1920, from portions of Brick Township, based on the results of a referendum held on May 19, 1920. The borough was reincorporated on March 12, 1928. Point Pleasant is distinct from Point Pleasant Beach, which is a separate community. The borough gets its name from Point Pleasant Beach, which gets its name from its location at the northern end of the Barnegat Peninsula, a long, narrow barrier peninsula that divides the Barnegat Bay from the Atlantic Ocean at the Manasquan Inlet.

== History ==
Around 1500, the area that included the future Point Pleasant was the ceremonial meeting place of the Lenape Native Americans, who called it the "Land of Tall Timber". In approximately 1665, the first European settlers arrived in the area, mainly fishermen, farmers and boat builders.

On February 15, 1850, Governor Daniel Haines and the New Jersey Legislature separated Ocean County from Monmouth County and created Brick Township, including the Point Pleasant area, which became independent of Brick Township in 1920, though the post office carried the designation "West Point Pleasant" until 1956. According to the town's official website, many longtime residents still use that name. The town's first mayor was Melville B. Parker, chosen after J.H. Harvey declined the position after being elected. The town was initially a logging town, although logging was never a significant part of the local economy.

In 1925, the Manasquan River-Bay Head Canal was completed as part of the inland waterway. The canal, which divides Point Pleasant in half, provides a passage for boats, and is the northernmost leg of the Intracoastal Waterway, which traverses the East Coast of the United States along the Atlantic Ocean between New Jersey and Florida. In 1964, Senator Clifford P. Case introduced legislation that changed the canal's name to the Point Pleasant Canal. The two lift bridges over the canal, at Route 88 and Bridge Avenue, can be opened as many as 300 times per day during the summer to allow boats to pass underneath as marine traffic has the right of way.

Though often regarded as a summer resort, the borough's website emphasizes that it is a "year-round community of approximately 19,000 residents".

The borough's flag was designed by Carlo Kirk Polino, who created it at the age of 12 and presented it to the borough council in 2024, which adopted it unanimously.

== Geography ==
According to the United States Census Bureau, the borough had a total area of 4.17 square miles (10.79 km^{2}), including 3.49 square miles (9.04 km^{2}) of land and 0.67 square miles (1.75 km^{2}) of water (16.16%).

The borough is bounded on the north by the Manasquan River, on the east by Point Pleasant Beach and Bay Head, on the south by Beaver Dam Creek and on the west by Brick Township; the borough also borders Mantoloking in Ocean County and Brielle in Monmouth County.

== Demographics ==
Historical population
Census	Pop.	Note	%±
1930	2,058		—
1940	2,082		1.2%
1950	4,009		92.6%
1960	10,182		154.0%
1970	15,968		56.8%
1980	17,747		11.1%
1990	18,177		2.4%
2000	19,306		6.2%
2010	18,392		−4.7%
2020	18,941		3.0%
2023 (est.)	19,429	▲	2.6%
Population sources: 1930–2000 1930; 1940–2000 2000; 2010 2020

=== 2020 census ===
As of the 2020 census, Point Pleasant had a population of 18,941. The median age was 44.5 years. 20.5% of residents were under the age of 18 and 18.3% of residents were 65 years of age or older. For every 100 females there were 94.6 males, and for every 100 females age 18 and over there were 92.3 males age 18 and over.

100.0% of residents lived in urban areas, while 0.0% lived in rural areas.

There were 7,506 households in Point Pleasant, of which 29.2% had children under the age of 18 living in them. Of all households, 53.2% were married-couple households, 15.7% were households with a male householder and no spouse or partner present, and 24.9% were households with a female householder and no spouse or partner present. About 25.3% of all households were made up of individuals and 11.1% had someone living alone who was 65 years of age or older.

There were 8,485 housing units, of which 11.5% were vacant. The homeowner vacancy rate was 1.0% and the rental vacancy rate was 4.8%.

Racial composition as of the 2020 census
Race	Number	Percent
White	17,178	90.7%
Black or African American	69	0.4%
American Indian and Alaska Native	63	0.3%
Asian	158	0.8%
Native Hawaiian and Other Pacific Islander	11	0.1%
Some other race	488	2.6%
Two or more races	974	5.1%
Hispanic or Latino (of any race)	1,327	7.0%

=== 2010 census ===
The 2010 United States census counted 18,392 people, 7,273 households, and 4,982 families in the borough. The population density was 5,272.1 inhabitants per square mile (2,035.6/km^{2}). There were 8,331 housing units at an average density of 2,388.1 per square mile (922.1/km^{2}). The racial makeup was 96.05% (17,666) White, 0.41% (75) Black or African American, 0.13% (24) Native American, 0.72% (133) Asian, 0.03% (6) Pacific Islander, 1.66% (305) from other races, and 0.99% (183) from two or more races. Hispanic or Latino of any race were 5.08% (935) of the population.

Of the 7,273 households, 30.0% had children under the age of 18; 52.5% were married couples living together; 11.6% had a female householder with no husband present, and 31.5% were non-families. Of all households, 25.8% were made up of individuals and 9.9% had someone living alone who was 65 years of age or older. The average household size was 2.52 and the average family size was 3.03.

22.1% of the population were under the age of 18, 7.0% from 18 to 24, 24.3% from 25 to 44, 32.2% from 45 to 64, and 14.4% who were 65 years of age or older. The median age was 43.0 years. For every 100 females, the population had 94.2 males. For every 100 females ages 18 and older, there were 92.3 males.

The Census Bureau's 2006–2010 American Community Survey showed that (in 2010 inflation-adjusted dollars) median household income was $78,521 (with a margin of error of ± $3,209) and the median family income was $94,399 (± $4,750). Males had a median income of $67,632 (± $4,111) versus $47,428 (± $5,097) for females. The per capita income for the borough was $36,596 (± $1,783). About 1.8% of families and 3.6% of the population were below the poverty line, including 2.5% of those under age 18 and 6.6% of those age 65 or over.

=== 2000 census ===
As of the 2000 United States census, there were 19,306 people, 7,560 households, and 5,231 families residing in the borough. The population density was 5,461.6 inhabitants per square mile (2,108.7/km^{2}). There were 8,350 housing units at an average density of 2,362.2 per square mile (912.1/km^{2}). The racial makeup of the borough was 85.83% White, 5.33% African-American, Hispanic or Latino of any race were 10.41%, 0.14% Native American, 0.54% Asian, 0.01% Pacific Islander, 0.50% from other races, and 0.69% from two or more races.

There were 7,560 households, out of which 32.1% had children under the age of 18 living with them, 54.8% were married couples living together, 10.9% had a female householder with no spouse, and 30.8% were non-families. 25.7% of all households were made up of individuals, and 10.5% had someone living alone who was 65 years of age or older. The average household size was 2.52 and the average family size was 3.06.

In the borough, the population was spread out, with 23.7% under the age of 18, 6.0% from 18 to 24, 30.5% from 25 to 44, 24.8% from 45 to 64, and 14.9% who were 65 years of age or older. The median age was 39 years. For every 100 females, there were 92.5 males. For every 100 females age 18 and over, there were 89.6 males.

The median income for a household in the borough was $55,987, and the median income for a family was $64,798. Males had a median income of $50,828 versus $32,886 for females. The per capita income for the borough was $25,715. About 2.0% of families and 3.2% of the population were below the poverty line, including 3.0% of those under age 18 and 5.2% of those age 65 or over.

== Government ==
=== Local government ===
Point Pleasant is governed under the borough form of New Jersey municipal government, which is used in 218 municipalities (of the 564) statewide, making it the most common form of government in New Jersey. The governing body is comprised of the mayor and the six-member borough council, with all positions elected at-large on a partisan basis as part of the November general election. A mayor is elected directly by the voters to a four-year term of office. The borough council includes six members elected to serve three-year terms on a staggered basis, with two seats coming up for election each year in a three-year cycle. The borough form of government used by Point Pleasant is a "weak mayor / strong council" government in which council members act as the legislative body with the mayor presiding at meetings and voting only in the event of a tie. The mayor can veto ordinances subject to an override by a two-thirds majority vote of the council. The mayor makes committee and liaison assignments for council members, and most appointments are made by the mayor with the advice and consent of the council.

The mayor is the head of the municipal government; sees that state laws and borough ordinances are faithfully executed; presides over the council. The mayor is the head of municipal government; sees that state laws and borough ordinances are faithfully executed; presides over the council. Votes only to break ties; can veto ordinances subject to override by two-thirds majority of Council; and appoints subordinate officers with council approval. After thirty days or upon council disapproval, Council fills posts. The borough council is the legislative body of the municipality. The Council overrides a mayor's veto by a two-thirds majority of all members, confirms mayor's appointments. The council gains appointment power upon failure to confirm mayor's appointee or after an office vacancy for thirty days. The council has all executive responsibility, not placed in the office of mayor.

As of 2025, the mayor of Point Pleasant is Republican Robert A. Sabosik, whose term of office ends December 31, 2026. The members of the Borough Council are Borough President Joseph Furmato Jr. (R, 2025), Charlene Archer (R, 2025), William T. Borowsky (R, 2024), Valerie Coulson (R, 2026), Antoinette "Toni" DePaola (R, 2027), William "Butch" Stevenson (R, 2027) and Joseph Veni (R, 2026).

In the November 2022 election, Mayor Robert A. Sabosik defeated independent challenger William "Bill" Borowsky, securing another four-year mayoral term. Sabosik received 63.34% of votes, while Borowsky received 36.40% of votes. Republican incumbents Joseph Furmato Jr. and Charlene Archer will each serve another three-year term after running unopposed for borough council.

In February 2015, the borough council selected Michael Thulen Jr., from a list of three candidates recommended by the Republican municipal committee, to fill the seat expiring in December 2016 that had been held by Robert A. Sabosik, vacant until he was sworn in as mayor the previous month. In the November 2015 general election, Thulen was elected to serve the one year remaining on the term of office.

=== Federal, state and county representation ===
Point Pleasant is in the 4th Congressional District and is part of New Jersey's 10th state legislative district.

Before the 2010 Census, all of Point Pleasant had been part of the 4th Congressional District, a change made by the New Jersey Redistricting Commission that took effect in January 2013, based on the results of the November 2012 general elections. As part of the 2010 redistricting, 1,802 residents in a wedge-shaped section in the western part of the borough were placed in the 3rd District, while the remaining 16,590 were placed in the 4th District.

For the 119th United States Congress, New Jersey's 4th congressional district is represented by Chris Smith (R, Manchester Township). New Jersey is represented in the United States Senate by Democrats Cory Booker (Newark, term ends 2027) and Andy Kim (Moorestown, term ends 2031).

For the 2026–2027 session, the 10th legislative district of the New Jersey Legislature is represented in the State Senate by James W. Holzapfel (R, Toms River) and in the General Assembly by Paul Kanitra (R, Point Pleasant Beach) and Gregory P. McGuckin (R, Toms River).

Ocean County is governed by a Board of County Commissioners composed of five members who are elected on an at-large basis in partisan elections and serving staggered three-year terms of office, with either one or two seats coming up for election each year as part of the November general election. At an annual reorganization held in the beginning of January, the board chooses a director and a deputy director from among its members. As of 2025, Ocean County's Commissioners (with party affiliation, term-end year and residence) are:

John P. Kelly (R, 2025, Eagleswood Township), Virginia E. Haines (R, 2025, Toms River), Robert Arace (R, Manchester Township, 2027) Jennifer Bacchione (R, Berkeley Township, 2027) and Frank Sadeghi (R, 2026, Toms River).

Constitutional officers elected on a countywide basis are: Clerk Scott M. Colabella (R, 2025, Barnegat Light), Sheriff Michael G. Mastronardy (R, 2025; Toms River) and Surrogate Jeffrey Moran (R, 2028, Beachwood).

=== Politics ===
As of March 2011, there were a total of 12,681 registered voters in Point Pleasant, of which 2,336 (18.4%) were registered as Democrats, 4,026 (31.7%) were registered as Republicans and 6,311 (49.8%) were registered as Unaffiliated. There were 8 voters registered as Libertarians or Greens. Among the borough's 2010 Census population, 68.9% (vs. 63.2% in Ocean County) were registered to vote, including 88.5% of those ages 18 and over (vs. 82.6% countywide).

Gubernatorial election results for Point Pleasant
Year	Republican		Democratic		Third party(ies)	
Year	No.	%	No.	%	No.	%
2025	5,811	60.01%	3,828	39.53%	45	0.46%
2021	5,658	67.95%	2,602	31.25%	67	0.80%
2017	3,640	59.42%	2,365	38.61%	121	1.98%
2013	4,352	71.63%	1,619	26.65%	105	1.73%
2009	4,606	65.12%	1,977	27.95%	490	6.93%
2005	3,052	53.32%	2,406	42.03%	266	4.65%

In the 2012 presidential election, Republican Mitt Romney received 56.7% of the vote (5,141 cast), ahead of Democrat Barack Obama with 42.4% (3,843 votes) and other candidates with 1.0% (89 votes), among the 9,161 ballots cast by the borough's 13,245 registered voters (88 ballots were spoiled), for a turnout of 69.2%. In the 2008 presidential election, Republican John McCain received 56.5% of the vote (5,599 cast), ahead of Democrat Barack Obama with 41.4% (4,103 votes) and other candidates with 1.4% (138 votes), among the 9,904 ballots cast by the borough's 13,154 registered voters, for a turnout of 75.3%. In the 2004 presidential election, Republican George W. Bush received 60.5% of the vote (5,857 ballots cast), outpolling Democrat John Kerry with 38.2% (3,700 votes) and other candidates with 0.7% (85 votes), among the 9,683 ballots cast by the borough's 12,795 registered voters, for a turnout percentage of 75.7.

Presidential Elections Results
Year	Republican	Democratic	Third Parties
2024	61.9% 7,304	36.3% 4,280	1.8% 174
2020	59.1% 7,233	39.3% 4,806	1.6% 152
2016	62.3% 6,209	34.4% 3,483	3.3% 333
2012	56.7% 5,141	42.4% 3,843	1.0% 89
2008	56.5% 5,599	41.4% 4,103	1.4% 138
2004	60.5% 5,857	38.2% 3,700	0.7% 85

In the 2013 gubernatorial election, Republican Chris Christie received 71.6% of the vote (4,352 cast), ahead of Democrat Barbara Buono with 26.6% (1,619 votes) and other candidates with 1.7% (105 votes), among the 6,179 ballots cast by the borough's 13,118 registered voters (103 ballots were spoiled), for a turnout of 47.1%. In the 2009 gubernatorial election, Republican Chris Christie received 64.4% of the vote (4,606 ballots cast), ahead of Democrat Jon Corzine with 27.6% (1,977 votes), Independent Chris Daggett with 5.9% (421 votes) and other candidates with 1.0% (69 votes), among the 7,152 ballots cast by the borough's 12,905 registered voters, yielding a 55.4% turnout.

United States Senate election results for Point Pleasant1
Year	Republican		Democratic		Third party(ies)	
Year	No.	%	No.	%	No.	%
2024	6,899	60.88%	4,341	38.31%	92	0.81%
2018	5,288	61.90%	2,905	34.00%	350	4.10%
2012	4,827	56.28%	3,585	41.80%	164	1.91%
2006	3,346	57.46%	2,287	39.28%	190	3.26%

United States Senate election results for Point Pleasant2
Year	Republican		Democratic		Third party(ies)	
Year	No.	%	No.	%	No.	%
2020	7,138	59.93%	4,606	38.67%	166	1.39%
2014	3,063	58.13%	2,073	39.34%	133	2.52%
2013	2,210	60.97%	1,387	38.26%	28	0.77%
2008	5,345	58.76%	3,582	39.38%	170	1.87%

== Education ==
The Point Pleasant School District serves students in pre-kindergarten through twelfth grade. As of the 2023–24 school year, the district, comprised of four schools, had an enrollment of 2,659 students and 240.6 classroom teachers (on an FTE basis), for a student–teacher ratio of 11.1:1. Schools in the district (with 2023–24 enrollment data from the National Center for Education Statistics) are Nellie F. Bennett Elementary School with 708 students in grades PreK–5, Ocean Road Elementary School with 481 students in PreK–5 Memorial Middle School with 593 students in 6–8 and Point Pleasant Borough High School with 856 students in grades 9–12.

Saint Peter School, founded in 1923, serves students in grades K–8 and operates under the supervision of the Roman Catholic Diocese of Trenton. In 2016, the school was one of ten schools in New Jersey, and one of four private schools in the state, recognized as a National Blue Ribbon School by the United States Department of Education, a recognition celebrating excellence in academics.

== Infrastructure ==
=== Transportation ===
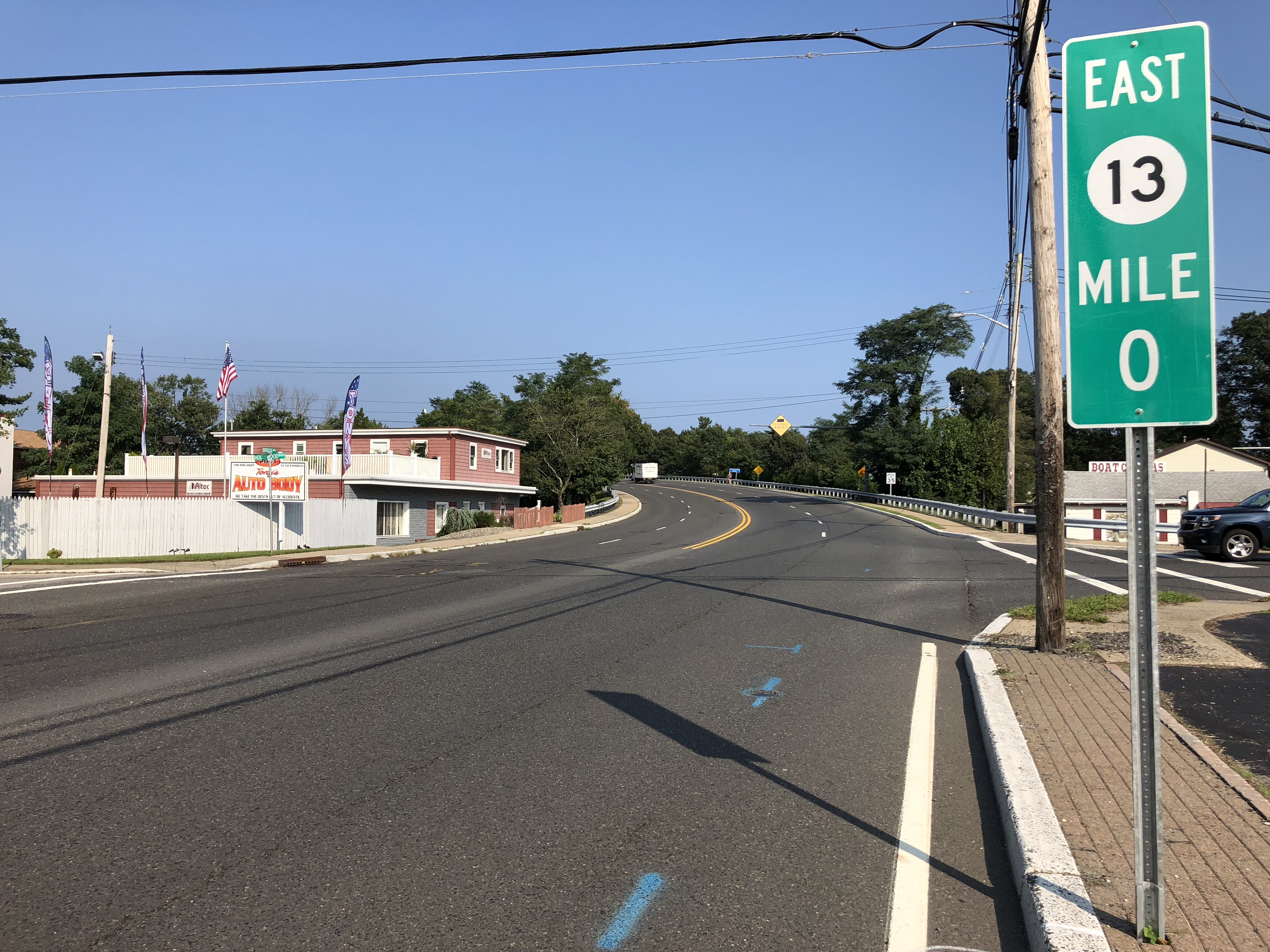
Route 13 eastbound in Point Pleasant

==== Roads and highways ====
As of May 2010, the borough had a total of 78.04 miles (125.59 km) of roadways, of which 64.28 miles (103.45 km) were maintained by the municipality, 7.86 miles (12.65 km) by Ocean County and 3.30 miles (5.31 km) by the New Jersey Department of Transportation.

State highways include Route 13, which extends a total of .56 miles (0.90 km), most of which is in the borough with a small portion in Bay Head. Route 88 traverses the borough to its eastern terminus at Route 35, just across the border with Point Pleasant Beach. Also, Route 70 skirts through the northwest part of the borough between Brick and Brielle on the September 11th Memorial Bridge, which crosses the Manasquan River.

==== Public transportation ====
NJ Transit provides bus service to Philadelphia on the 317 route.

Ocean Ride local service is provided on the OC3A Brick—Point Pleasant and the OC4 Lakewood—Brick Link routes.

=== Health care ===
Point Pleasant Hospital was founded in 1918 and became part of Ocean Medical Center in 1982. The hospital closed permanently in 2001.

== In media ==
- A fictionalized version of the town was the setting of a short-lived 2005 television show, Point Pleasant.
- On The Tonight Show Starring Jimmy Fallon, there is a recurring spoof set in the borough called "Point Pleasant Police Department", in which the host and a guest (Alec Baldwin, Bill Hader, Jake Gyllenhaal and Kevin James) play local police officers who repeatedly spit food on each other.

== Notable people ==
People who were born in, residents of, or otherwise closely associated with Point Pleasant include: ((B) denotes that the person was born there)

- Antonella Barba (born 1986), contestant on the sixth season of American Idol
- Rachel Bolan (born 1966), bass guitar player and main songwriter of the metal band, Skid Row
- Agnes Boulton (1893–1968), pulp fiction writer who married Eugene O'Neill, living in her home there after their marriage
- Robert Brower (1850–1934), actor who appeared in many films., including several from Edison Studios(B)
- Jason Cairns, soccer player
- Peter Cancro, CEO of Jersey Mike's Subs, who started working at the chain's Point Pleasant location as a 14-year-old
- Caroline Casagrande (born 1976), member of the New Jersey General Assembly representing the 11th District, who was the youngest assemblywoman ever when she was elected in 2008
- Nancy Chard (1933–2010), politician who served in the Vermont House of Representatives and in the Vermont Senate(B)
- Andrew R. Ciesla (born 1953), politician who served in the New Jersey Senate from 1992 to 2012, where he represented the 10th Legislative District(B)
- Fred J. Cook (1911–2003), investigative journalist and author(B)
- Dick Cooke (born 1956), head coach of the Davidson Wildcats baseball team since 1991 who spent three years pitching in the minor leagues for the Boston Red Sox
- Chris Cummiskey (born 1964), former member of both the Arizona State Senate and the Arizona House of Representatives(B)
- Tawny Cypress (born 1976), actress who appeared on K-Ville as Ginger "Love Tap" LeBeau
- Arnold D'Ambrosa (born 1933), politician who served in the New Jersey General Assembly from 1974 to 1976, until his career was cut short by a political scandal
- Michael J. Doherty (born 1963), Surrogate of Warren County, New Jersey, who served in the New Jersey Senate from 2009 to 2022
- Kirsten Dunst (born 1982), actress(B)
- William P. Fitzpatrick (1940–1975), politician who represented the 10th legislative district in the New Jersey General Assembly from 1974 until his death
- Marlene Lynch Ford (born 1954), politician, prosecutor and jurist who served in the New Jersey General Assembly
- Jeff Frazier (born 1982), professional outfielder who played in Major League Baseball for the Detroit Tigers in 2010
- Todd Frazier (born 1986), retired major league baseball player
- Virginia E. Haines (born 1946), politician who serves on the Ocean County Board of Chosen Freeholders and had served in the New Jersey General Assembly from 1992 to 1994 and as executive director of the New Jersey Lottery from 1994 to 2002
- Kelsey Haycook (born 1993), soccer player who played for the Portland Thorns FC
- Frankie Hayes (1914–1955), catcher who played for 14 seasons in Major League Baseball who holds the record for most consecutive games played by a catcher
- Laurel Hester (1956–2006), police officer who rose to national attention with her deathbed appeal for the extension of pension benefits to her domestic partner
- Jacqui Kapinowski (born 1962), Paralympian who competed in wheelchair curling at the 2010 Winter Paralympics and in rowing at the 2016 Summer Paralympics
- Leonard Lomell (1919–2011), United States Army Ranger who played a pivotal role in destroying German gun emplacements on D-Day
- Ryan Malleck (born 1993), American football tight end for the Houston Texans of the National Football League
- "Irish" Teddy Mann (born 1951), former professional boxer(B)
- A. Dale "Bud" Mayo, business executive who is the founder of Digital Cinema Destinations Corp
- James M. Murray, 26th Director of the United States Secret Service, serving in that position since May 2019(B)
- Eugene O'Neill (1888–1953), playwright
- Oona O'Neill (1925–1991), daughter of Eugene O'Neill and writer Agnes Boulton, and the fourth and last wife of comic and filmmaker Charlie Chaplin
- Diamond Dallas Page (born 1956), former professional wrestler(B)
- Christie Pearce (born 1975; formerly Christie Rampone), USA Soccer player
- Kurt Pellegrino (born 1979), MMA fighter who competes under the UFC brand
- Soraya (1969–2006), Grammy Award-winning, musician(B)
- Michael John Trotta (born 1978), composer and conductor
- Arthur Augustus Zimmerman (1869–1936), cycling sprint rider who won the first world championship in 1893
