= Hugo Pfaltz =

American politician (1931–2019)

Hugo Menzel Pfaltz Jr. (September 23, 1931 – August 31, 2019) was an American lawyer and Republican Party politician who served two terms in the New Jersey General Assembly.

Born in Newark, Pfaltz graduated from Millburn High School. He was a graduate of Hamilton College and Harvard Law School, and served in the United States Navy Reserve.

Pfaltz lived in Summit, New Jersey and practiced law there. He was elected to the Assembly in 1967, running on a ticket with former Assemblyman Peter McDonough; they defeated former Assemblywoman Irene Griffin and Kenneth White. Pfaltz beat White by 812 votes. In the General Election, McDonough and Pfaltz defeated Democrats George Perselay and Joseph Gannon by wide margins. He was re-elected to a second term in 1969, this time running with incumbent Herbert Heilmann in a newly-drawn district; they defeated Democrats Michael Mehr and Peter Humanik by wide margins. Pfaltz did not run again in 1971.

He married Marilyn Mildred Muir of Chappaqua, New York on September 30, 1956. They have three children. Pfaltz died in Summit on August 31, 2019 at the age of 87.

New Jersey General Assembly
Preceded by Constituency established	Member of the New Jersey General Assembly from the 9C district January 9, 1968–January 13, 1970; Served alongside: Peter McDonough	Succeeded by Herbert H. Kiehn
Preceded by Herbert H. Kiehn	Member of the New Jersey General Assembly from the 9B district January 13, 1970–January 11, 1972; Served alongside: Herbert J. Heilmann, Elizabeth Cox	Succeeded by C. Louis Bassano; Herbert H. Kiehn
