= Les Sept Paroles de Notre Seigneur Jésus-Christ sur la Croix =

1855 oratorio composed by Charles Gounod

Les Sept Paroles de Notre Seigneur Jésus-Christ sur la Croix (The seven words of our Lord Jesus Christ on the cross) is an 1855 oratorio by Charles Gounod.

== Recordings ==
- Les Sept Paroles de Notre Seigneur Jésus-Christ sur la Croix, Ensemble Vocal de Lausanne, Michel Corboz, Mirare - with Les Sept Paroles du Christ sur la Croix by Franck
