= Peter McDonough =

American politician

Peter J. McDonough (August 24, 1925 – August 28, 1998) was an American Republican Party politician from New Jersey, who served in both houses of the New Jersey Legislature.

== Biography ==
McDonough was born in Plainfield, where he was a lifelong resident. He attended Plainfield High School and St. Lawrence University. During World War II, he served in the United States Army Air Corps in the Pacific Theater and Japan.

He was a member of the Union County Board of Chosen Freeholders from 1960 to 1963. In 1963 he was first elected to the New Jersey General Assembly, where he served as the chairman of the Education Committee and the Transportation and Public Utilities Committee. He was a delegate to the 1966 New Jersey Constitutional Convention. In 1971 he was elected to the New Jersey Senate to represent the 22nd Legislative District and served as chairman of the Transportation Committee.

After his retirement from the Legislature, he founded the public affairs consulting firm, Peter J. McDonough and Associates. His son, Peter J. McDonough Jr., was the director of communications for Governor Christine Todd Whitman.

New Jersey General Assembly
Preceded by Multi-member district	Member of the New Jersey General Assembly from the Union County district January 14, 1964–January 11, 1966	Succeeded by Multi-member district
Preceded by Constituency established	Member of the New Jersey General Assembly from the 9C district January 9, 1968–January 8, 1974; Served alongside: Hugo Pfaltz, Herbert H. Kiehn, Arthur Manner	Succeeded by Constituency abolished
New Jersey Senate
Preceded by Constituency established	Member of the New Jersey Senate from the 22nd district January 8, 1974–January 9, 1979	Succeeded by Donald DiFrancesco
