= Sayings of Jesus on the cross =

Seven expressions of Jesus during his crucifixion

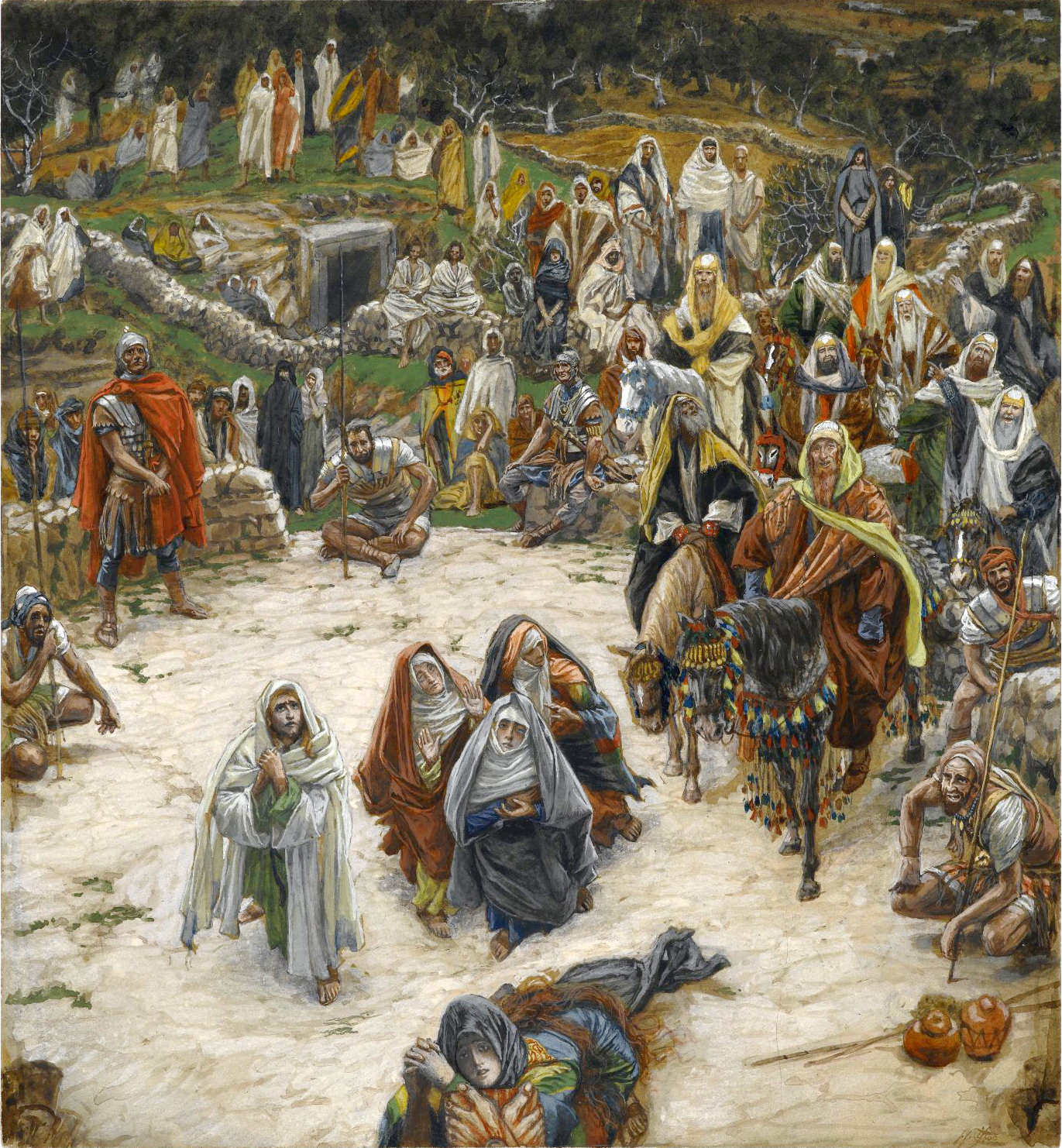
What Our Lord Saw from the Cross by James Tissot, c. 1890

The sayings of Jesus on the cross (sometimes called the Seven Last Words from the Cross) are seven expressions biblically attributed to Jesus during his crucifixion. Traditionally, the brief sayings have been called "words".

The seven sayings are gathered from the four canonical gospels. In Matthew and Mark, Jesus cries out to God. In Luke, he forgives his killers, reassures the penitent thief, and commends his spirit to the Father. In John, he speaks to his mother, says he thirsts, and declares the end of his earthly life. This is an example of the Christian approach to the construction of a gospel harmony, in which material from different gospels is combined, producing an account that goes beyond each gospel.

Since the 16th century, these sayings have been widely used in sermons on Good Friday, and entire books have been written on the theological analysis of them. The Seven Last Words from the Cross are an integral part of the liturgy in the Catholic, Protestant, and other Christian traditions. Several composers have set the sayings to music.

== Overview ==
In the following table, the seven sayings are arranged according to their traditional order. However, all seven sayings cannot be found in any one account of Jesus' crucifixion. The ordering is a harmonisation of the texts from each of the four canonical gospels. Three of the sayings appear only in Luke and three only in John. One other saying appears both in Matthew and Mark, and another ("It is finished") is only directly quoted in John but alluded to in Matthew and Mark.

Sayings of Jesus on the cross
Original Greek	King James translation	Matthew	Mark	Luke	John	Theological interpretations
Πάτερ, ἄφες αὐτοῖς, οὐ γὰρ οἴδασιν τί ποιοῦσιν	Father, forgive them; for they know not what they do.			23:34		Forgiveness
Ἀμήν σοι λέγω, σήμερον μετ' ἐμοῦ ἔσῃ ἐν τῷ παραδείσῳ	Verily I say unto thee, To day shalt thou be with me in paradise.			23:43		Salvation
Γύναι, ἴδε ὁ υἱός σου and Ἴδε ἡ μήτηρ σου	Woman, behold thy son! and Behold thy mother!				19:26–27	Relationship
ἔστιν θεέ μου θεέ μου ἱνατί με ἐγκατέλιπες and ὁ θεός μου ὁ θεός μου εἰς τί ἐγκατέλιπές με	My God, my God, why hast thou forsaken me?	27:46	15:34			Vindication
Διψῶ	I thirst.				19:28	Distress
Τετέλεσται	It is finished.				19:30	Triumph
Πάτερ, εἰς χεῖράς σου παρατίθεμαι τὸ πνεῦμά μου	Father, into thy hands I commend my spirit.			23:46		Reunion

The sayings form part of the Stations of the Cross, a Christian meditation that is often used during Lent, Holy Week and Good Friday.

The Dominican author Timothy Radcliffe sees the number seven as significant, as the number of perfection in the Bible. He writes that as God created the world in seven days, "these seven words belong to God's completion of that creation".

=== Historicity ===
James Dunn considers the seven sayings weakly rooted in tradition and sees them as a part of the elaborations in the diverse retellings of Jesus' final hours. He does, however, argue in favour of the authenticity of the Mark/Matthew saying, in which Jesus seems to describe himself as forsaken by God. This would have been an embarrassment to the early Church, and hence would likely not have been invented. Leslie Houlden suggests that Luke may have deliberately excluded this saying from his gospel because it did not fit in with the model of Jesus he was presenting.

Michael Licona suggests that John has redacted Jesus' authentic statements as recorded in Matthew, Mark and Luke. Where Matthew and Mark have Jesus quote Psalm 22:1, John records that "in order that the Scripture may be fulfilled, Jesus said, 'I am thirsty'." Jesus' final words as recorded in Luke are simplified in John into "It is finished."

== The seven sayings ==
=== 1. Father, forgive them; for they know not what they do ===
Then said Jesus, Father, forgive them; for they know not what they do.

— Luke 23:34

This first saying of Jesus on the cross is traditionally called "The Word of Forgiveness". It is theologically interpreted as Jesus' prayer for forgiveness for the Roman soldiers who were crucifying him and all others who were involved in his crucifixion.

Some early manuscripts do not include this sentence in Luke 23:34. Biblical scholars such as Bart Ehrman have argued that the words were omitted by some scribes because of anti-Judaic sentiment around the second century.

=== 2. To day shalt thou be with me in paradise ===
And Jesus said unto him, Verily I say unto thee, To day shalt thou be with me in paradise.

— Luke 23:43

This saying is traditionally called "The Word of Salvation". According to the Gospel of Luke, Jesus was crucified between two thieves (traditionally named Dismas and Gestas), one of whom (Dismas) supports Jesus' innocence and asks him to remember him when he comes into his kingdom. Jesus replies, "Verily I say unto thee..." (ἀμήν λέγω σοί, amēn legō soi), followed with the only appearance of the word "Paradise" in the gospels (παραδείσω, paradeisō, originally from Persian pairidaeza, "paradise garden").

A seemingly simple change in punctuation in this saying has been the subject of doctrinal differences among Christian groups, given the lack of punctuation in the original Greek texts. Catholics and most Protestant Christians usually use a version which reads "today you will be with me in Paradise". This reading assumes a direct voyage to Heaven and has no implications of purgatory. On the other hand, some Protestants who believe in soul sleep have used a reading which emphasizes "I say to you today", leaving open the possibility that the statement was made today, but arrival in Heaven may be later.

=== 3. Woman, behold, thy son! Behold, thy mother! ===
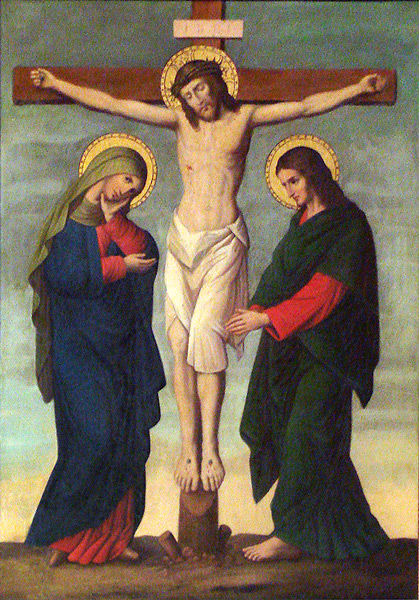
Crucifixion depicted as Stabat Mater with the Virgin Mary, Porto Alegre, Brazil, 19th century

When Jesus therefore saw his mother, and the disciple standing by, whom he loved, he saith unto his mother, Woman, behold thy son! Then saith he to the disciple, Behold thy mother! And from that hour that disciple took her unto his own home.

— John 19:26–27

This statement is traditionally called "The Word of Relationship" and in it Jesus entrusts Mary, his mother, into the care of "the disciple whom Jesus loved".

Jesus also addresses his mother as "woman" in John 2:4. Although this sounds dismissive in English, the Greek word is a term of respect or tenderness. Catholic commentators, on the basis of these two passages, often connect Mary with the "woman" of Genesis 3:15, and the "woman clothed with the sun" in Revelation 12, and therefore see this title of "woman" as a justification for the veneration of Mary as a second Eve.

=== 4. My God, my God, why hast thou forsaken me? ===
And at the ninth hour Jesus cried with a loud voice, saying, Eloi, Eloi, lama sabachthani? which is, being interpreted, My God, my God, why hast thou forsaken me?

— Mark 15:34

And the ninth hour Jesus cried with a loud voice, saying, Eli, Eli, lama sabachthani? that is to say, My God, my God, why hast thou forsaken me?

— Matthew 27:46

This saying, traditionally called "The Word of Abandonment", is the only one that appears in more than one gospel. In both accounts, the words spoken by Jesus have been transliterated from Aramaic into Greek, and there are slight differences between the two versions (Mark: Ἐλωΐ, Ἐλωΐ, λαμὰ σαβαχθανί; Matthew: Ἠλί, Ἠλί, λεμὰ σαβαχθανί). In both cases, σαβαχθανί seems to be the Greek transliteration of Aramaic שבקתני šəḇaqtanī, meaning "forsaken me".

Both versions can be said to be in Aramaic rather than in closely related Hebrew because of the verb שבק (šbq) "abandon", which exists only in Aramaic. The Hebrew counterpart to this word, עזב (zb), is seen in the second line of the Old Testament's Psalm 22, which the saying appears to quote. Thus, Jesus is not quoting the canonical Hebrew version (ēlī ēlī lāmā 'azabtānī), attributed in some Jewish interpretations to King David, but rather the version in an Aramaic Targum (translation of the Bible). Surviving Aramaic Targums do use the verb šbq in their translations of the Psalm 22.

In the next verse, in both accounts, some who hear Jesus' cry imagine that he is calling for help from Elijah (Ēlīyā in Aramaic).

The Aramaic word form שבקתני šəḇaqtanī is based on the verb šǝḇaq/šāḇaq, 'to allow, to permit, to forgive, and to forsake', with the perfect tense ending -t (2nd person singular: 'you'), and the object suffix -anī (1st person singular: 'me').

In Hebrew, the saying would be "אֵלִי אֵלִי, לָמָה עֲזַבְתָּנִי" (ēlī ēlī, lāmā 'azabtānī in Biblical Hebrew, eli eli lama azavtani in Modern Hebrew pronunciation), while the Syriac-Aramaic phrase according to the Peshitta would be Syriac: ܐܝܠܝ ܐܝܠܝ ܠܡܐ ܫܒܩܬܢܝ, romanized: ʔēl ʔēl lǝmā šǝḇaqtān (Matthew 27:46) or Syriac: ܐܠܗܝ ܐܠܗܝ ܠܡܢܐ ܫܒܩܬܢܝ, romanized: ʾalāh ʾalāh lǝmānā šǝḇaqtān (Mark 15:34).

This saying is taken by some as an abandonment of the Son by the Father, though the expression of abandonment by God represents a cry of pain in a difficult circumstance rather a loss of faith, with the subsequent narrative in Matthew showing that God did not forsake Jesus. Another interpretation holds that at the moment when Jesus took upon himself the sins of humanity, the Father had to turn away from the Son because the Father is "of purer eyes than to see evil and cannot look at wrong" (ESV). Other theologians understand the cry as that of one who was truly human and who felt forsaken. Put to death by his foes, very largely deserted by his friends, he may have also felt deserted by God.

Others see these words in the context of Psalm 22 and suggest that Jesus recited these words, perhaps even the whole psalm, "that he might show himself to be the very Being to whom the words refer; so that the Jewish scribes and people might examine and see the cause why he would not descend from the cross; namely, because this very psalm showed that it was appointed that he should suffer these things."

=== 5. I thirst ===
After this, Jesus knowing that all things were now accomplished, that the scripture might be fulfilled, saith, I thirst.

— John 19:28

This statement is traditionally called "The Word of Distress" and is compared and contrasted with the encounter of Jesus with the Samaritan woman at the well in John 4.

Only John records this saying, but all four gospels relate that Jesus was offered a drink of sour wine (possibly posca). In Mark and Matthew, a sponge was soaked in the wine and lifted up to Jesus on a reed; John says the same, but states that the sponge was affixed to a hyssop branch. This may have been intended as symbolically significant, as hyssop branches are often mentioned in the Old Testament in the context of the use of sacrificial blood for ritual purification.

This statement of Jesus is interpreted by John as fulfilment of the prophecy given in Psalm 69:21, "in my thirst they gave me vinegar to drink"; hence the quotation from John's gospel includes the comment "that the scripture might be fulfilled". The Jerusalem Bible cross-references Psalm 22:15: "my palate is drier than a potsherd, and my tongue is stuck to my jaw".

=== 6. It is finished ===
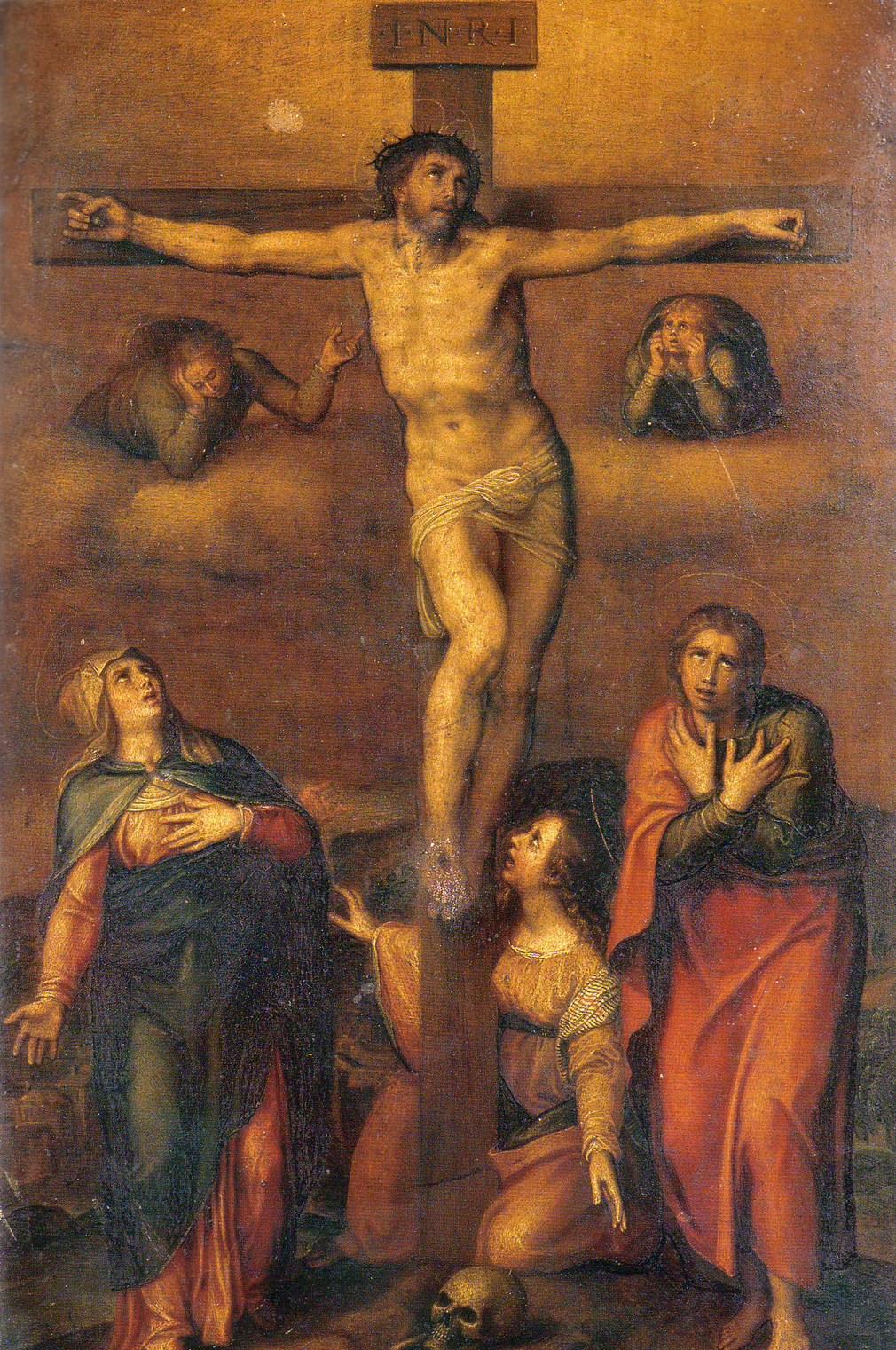
Michelangelo: Crucifixion of Christ, 1540

When Jesus therefore had received the vinegar, he said, It is finished: and he bowed his head, and gave up the ghost.

— John 19:30

This statement is traditionally called "The Word of Triumph" and is theologically interpreted as the announcement of the end of the earthly life of Jesus, in anticipation for the Resurrection.

The Greek word translated "It is finished" is tetelestai (τετέλεσται). The verse has also been translated as "It is consummated."

The utterance after consuming the beverage and immediately before death is mentioned, but not explicitly quoted, in Mark 15:37 and Matthew 27:50 (both of which state that Jesus "cried with a loud voice, and gave up the ghost").

=== 7. Father, into thy hands I commend my spirit ===
And when Jesus had cried with a loud voice, he said, Father, into thy hands I commend my spirit: and having said thus, he gave up the ghost.

— Luke 23:46

From Psalm 31:5, this saying, which is an announcement and not a request, is traditionally called "The Word of Reunion" and is theologically interpreted as the proclamation of Jesus joining God the Father in Heaven.

The words of Luke 23:46, or the fuller Psalm 31:5, have subsequently been attributed as last words of famous people, especially those considered pious Christians, such as martyrs or saints. These include Philip the Apostle (died AD 80), Basil the Great (AD 379), Charlemagne (died 814), Ansgar (865), Thomas Becket (1170), Jan Hus (1415), Christopher Columbus (1506), Ludovica Albertoni (1533), Martin Luther (1546), George Wishart (1546), Lady Jane Grey (1554), her father Henry, Duke of Suffolk (1555), Thomas of Villanova (1555), Mary, Queen of Scots (1587), Aloysius Gonzaga (1591), Torquato Tasso (1595), Turibius of Mogrovejo (1606), John Bruen (1625), George Herbert (1633), Covenanters including Hugh Mackail (1666) and James Renwick (1688), and Christian Friedrich Schwarz (1798).

== See also ==
- Musical settings of sayings of Jesus on the cross
- Stations of the Cross
- Aramaic of Jesus
- Crucifixion of Jesus
- Life of Jesus in the New Testament
- Three Hours' Agony

== Bibliography ==
- Butler, Alban (1866). The Lives of the Saints. Dublin: James Duffy – via Bartleby.com.
- Lockyer, Herbert (1975). Last words of saints and sinners. Grand Rapids, Mich.: Kregel Publications. ISBN 978-0-8254-3102-9.
