= Herbert H. Kiehn =

American politician

Herbert Henry Kiehn Sr. (December 19, 1908 – July 1987) was an American Republican Party politician who served in the New Jersey General Assembly from 1968 to 1974.

== Biography ==
He was born on December 19, 1908, in Manhattan, New York City. Kiehn married to Ida Helen Kiehn.

He was first elected to the New Jersey General Assembly in 1967, and was re-elected in 1969 and 1971. He was defeated for re-election in 1973 by 3,609 votes. As an Assemblyman, Kiehn chaired the New Jersey State Fluoridation Study Commission which recommended the mandatory addition of the tooth decay inhibitor to the state's water supply despite Kiehn's opposition. Kiehn's position was consistent with conservative politicians at the time who opposed "government-imposed additives in water or food."

During his six years as an Assemblyman, Kiehn ran in four different districts: he ran in Union County District 9B in 1967, along with Herbert J. Heilmann; in 1969, he was redistricted into District 9C, running with incumbent Peter J. McDonough; in 1971, he was moved to the newly-drawn District 9B, with C. Louis Bassano as his running mate; and in 1973, he ran with incumbent Arthur Manner in the newly created 22nd District. In response to U.S. national anthem protests, he proposed bills in 1969 and 1971 to criminalize what would be called forms of disrespect towards the anthem, both of which failed.

He died in July 1987.

== Children ==
- Herbert Henry Kiehn, Jr. (born September 23, 1936), who served as the Mayor of Chatham, New Jersey, from 2000 to 2004. He did not seek re-election to a second term as mayor in 2004 and was succeeded by Councilman Dick Plambeck. Kiehn served as liaison to the 9/11 Memorial Committee, Board of Health, Community Development Revenue Sharing Committee, Cable Television Committee, Environmental Commission, Historic Preservation Commission, Local Assistance Board, Shade Tree Commission, Streetscape Committee, Member of the Planning Board, Chairman of the Finance Committee, and Chairman of the Public Safety & Emergency Services Committee and the Madison-Chatham Joint Meeting. He served on the Chatham Library Board of Trustees.

New Jersey General Assembly
Preceded by Constituency established	Member of the New Jersey General Assembly from the 9B district January 9, 1968–January 13, 1970; Served alongside: Herbert J. Heilmann	Succeeded by Hugo Pfaltz
Preceded by Hugo Pfaltz	Member of the New Jersey General Assembly from the 9C district January 13, 1970–January 11, 1972; Served alongside: Peter McDonough	Succeeded by Arthur Manner
Preceded by Hugo Pfaltz; Elizabeth Cox	Member of the New Jersey General Assembly from the 9B district January 11, 1972–January 8, 1974; Served alongside: C. Louis Bassano	Succeeded by Constituency abolished
