= Historic sites in Cranford, New Jersey =

Cranford, New Jersey is home to a diverse number of historic architectural styles, historically significant buildings, and landmarks. Structures dating from 1740 through the present can be found in a relatively small area of the township.

A self-guided walking tour of Cranford architecture is available.

Additionally, an audio tour of 25 historic Cranford sites, created by the Cranford Historic Preservation Advisory Board and narrated by Bernie Wagenblast, is also available.

Historic sites in the township are overseen by the Cranford Historic Preservation Advisory Board, whose purpose is to identify, record and maintain a system for survey and inventory of all building sites, places and landmarks and structures of historical or architectural significance based on the Secretary of the Interior's Standards and Guidelines for Archeology and Historic Preservation.

== Historic houses and buildings of Cranford ==
=== The Sperry Homes ===
Thomas Sperry and his brother, William Miller Sperry contributed to Cranford architecture including the Sperry building at North Avenue and Alden Street. Their daughters married two of the Beinecke brothers, founders of Yale University's Beinecke Rare Book & Manuscript Library.

=== The Pierson House ===
The Pierson House, also known as the Crane House, is at 420 Riverside Drive. It is one of the best known houses in Cranford. Here the major clue is probably the house's proximity (like the Klein House to the Old York Road) to a major artery of colonial travel. In this case, the artery is Crane's Ford, a shallow and thus important stretch of the Rahway River. It was easily traversable on horseback during colonial days, and the Pierson House, built circa 1740, was probably put there to keep an eye on it.

The Pierson house started life as a 1 1/2 story wood structure, probably not that much different from others in town, but the original has disappeared under generations of renovations. The most recent, in 1929, restored the Pierson house to the correct time period, the middle 18th century, although on a much more grandiose scale. Inside, the original basement walls, some of the beams, and several of the pegged oak floor boards of the 1740 house remain, but on the whole, the Pierson House serves as a quintessential example of one of the unshakable laws of architecture; nothing exists in a vacuum.

The Pierson house today is a private residence, owned and occupied by members of the Shanks family. Repairs to the property are underway due to flood damage from Hurricane Irene.

=== Norris Oakey House ===
The Norris-Oakey House, also known as the Dunham-Oakey House, stands at 1119 Orange Avenue. First built in 1750, and then in 1820 transformed into an example of Cranford's first definitive architecture, the Federal style. The windows tell the story here. These are the smaller, squatter ones of the left hand side which remain from the original East Jersey Cottage. Imagine the far right-hand one is the door. When the house was enlarged, the old door became a window and a new door, probably like this one, complete with a row of Federal-style sidelights, was added. The taller windows, here on the 1820 addition, begin to look like ones on houses being built in the larger cities and towns of the new republic. So to keep up with what of the Federal style has trickled down to this predominately rural area, the old side gets another full story and a half, as shown by the knee windows under the eaves. Speaking of eaves, they are a Federal trait underneath called dentils, although these here are reproductions. Carried over from England in the books and works of architects Robert and John Adam in the late 18th century, Federalism takes its cues from buildings of ancient Pompeii which had just been excavated during the Adams' time. It is characterized by an imposing rigidity, relieved here and there by curves and a certain airiness not found in earlier high-styled buildings of the Georgian period. The trickling-down effect of any style leads to the term vernacular, so while although the Norris-Oakey House is hardly Federalism, it is a good rendering of what a few 1820 people out in the country.

=== The Vreeland House ===
The Vreeland House stands at 306 Lincoln Avenue East on the route of the Old York Road in Cranford. It was constructed around 1770, maybe earlier, as a simple one-room wooden structure with a large hearth. The house was subsequently enlarged in a series of building campaigns until c. 1840 when it was doubled in size and faced in brick, evidently as a wedding present to the daughter of the Vreeland family. It was the homestead of a large estate that extended along Lincoln Ave from Walnut to Centennial Ave and south to the area of Raritan Rd, where the Vreeland Mill was located near the river crossing. It is possible, but never proven, that a caretaker of nearby Droeschers Mill, living in the Vreeland House at the time, used its basement to store woolen blankets and supplies to be sent to George Washington's Army in Morristown during the winter of 1779–1780. Some say it is haunted.

=== Cranford Hall ===
Cranford Hall, at 600 Lincoln Park East, is an expansive reproduction of an English Norman Castle, with turrets, battlements, everything except a drawbridge. It was built for a silk baron and had land that went down to the Rahway River. Built in the early 1920s, Charles E. Kaltenbach envisioned his home to be a mecca for entertaining business tycoons and visiting celebrities and it numbered among its famous guests William Randolph Hearst and Gloria Swanson. It now houses a nursing and rehabilitation center for seniors.

=== 21 Springfield Avenue ===
This structure was built as a church at the turn of the 20th century by the Christian Scientists. It is now a condominium building.

=== The Cranford Roundhouse ===
Named to the 10 Most Endangered Historic Places in New Jersey in 2020, the Cranford Roundhouse is one of only three known surviving roundhouses in the state. Preservation NJ noted that the roundhouse had "enormous potential for adaptive reuse that would be attractive to the town’s growing population, such as artists’ studio space, a small performance/event venue, or a brewery." It was built between 1913 and 1915 to allow trains to turn around on the Central Railroad of New Jersey. The town's Department of Public Works has used it as a storage facility and vehicle work yard since 1960.

== Historic sites of Cranford ==
=== Mastodon Site ===
Two tusks (one measuring 4 feet 3 inches (130 cm)) and several bone fragments from an ancient American mastodon were found in June and August 1936 north of Kenilworth Blvd in what is now Lenape Park (other sources name the swampy area directly behind what is now the parking lot of Union County College's main building). Two Works Progress Administration workers digging an artificial lake in Lenape located the bones. The bones discovered are believed to have belonged to a young male that lived 12,000 years ago and probably washed down from farther north. They are the only known Ice Age mastodon specimens found in Union County, New Jersey.

=== Great Minisink Trail ===
Certain Native Americans lived most of the year in the Delaware Valley, and came to the coast only at certain seasons to hunt and fish. The Great Minisink Trail was a path for Lenape travel that stretched from to the Council Fire of Minisink Island on the Delaware River to the tidal area of Claypit Creek Park in Navesink not far from the beaches of Sandy Hook, New Jersey. In the Cranford area, the trail, which stayed west of the Rahway River, passed over Nomahegan Brook near where today's Lenape Park meets Echo Lake Park. It then traveled south, keeping east of the pond at Fairview Cemetery. Inside the Cranford line, it passed near a spring on what is now Indian Spring Road over what was once the farm of Gideon Ludlow off Gallows Hill Road. The Lenape called the Cranford area Wawahakewany or 'place where eggs are found.'

=== The Cranford Pepperidge Tree ===
At the side of the Old York Road grew "Old Peppy", the official tree of the Township of Cranford in what is now Lincoln Park (formerly the 1899-era grounds of the Cranford Golf Club, now moved to Westfield and called the Echo Lake Country Club). Felled in April 2015 out of safety concerns, the tree was a Nyssa sylvatica, also known as a black tupelo, tupelo, black gum, sour gum or pepperidge tree. A cross section of its trunk is preserved in a gazebo in Lincoln Park. Apparently in connection with the controversy surrounding the removal of "Old Peppy," a copper commemorative plaque was stolen from Lincoln Park. The plaque had been mounted by the Cranford Historical Society on a rock near the tree and was originally placed in 1964.

In 2024, a reading garden was built in the park. The cultivated shoots from Old Peppy's root system now form a grove of saplings offering shade to the newly dedicated Deborah Cannon Partridge Wolfe Reading Garden.

=== The Rock ===
Boundary rock etched by surveyors in 1699 during the grant of the "West fields" in Nomahegan Park.

=== Crane's Mills Site ===
A component of the Rahway River Parkway just north of the North Union Avenue bridge, this was the site of the two Crane family mills that gave the village its first name; "Crane's Mills." A gristmill was located on the north bank of the river in what is today's Sperry Park. A sawmill was located on the south bank behind today's Gray's Funeral Home. Both mills flanked the c. 1720 dam known later as "Hansel's Dam" because it was behind the home of Charles Hansel (today's funeral home). Archaeological digs at both mill sites in the early 1970s uncovered foundations, machinery mounts, clay pipes, bottles, buttons and tools. Today, the annual rubber ducky derby, held in Sperry Park as a fundraiser for the Hanson Park Conservancy, races over the little falls at Hansel's Dam.

=== Crane Farm and Village Site ===
In 1971, the Cranford Historical Society marked the farm and village home of Josiah Crane Sr. (1791–1873) in what is now Josiah Crane Park on the Rahway River at the corner of Springfield and North Union Avenue. Crane Sr. built what is now the Crane-Phillips House as a honeymoon cottage for his son, Josiah Crane Jr.

=== Crane's Ford Monument ===
Located on Riverside Drive at Springfield Avenue, the monument marks the site of Crane's Ford, the low-water crossing place on the Rahway River. Tradition has it that in the Revolutionary War mounted sentinels stationed at this site carried warning of the approaching British to Washington at Morristown. The Township takes its name from this spot. The Cranford Historical Society erected the tablet to Crane's Ford on July 4, 1929, which was unveiled by Cranford's oldest living Civil War veteran at the time.;

=== Cranford Canoe Club ===
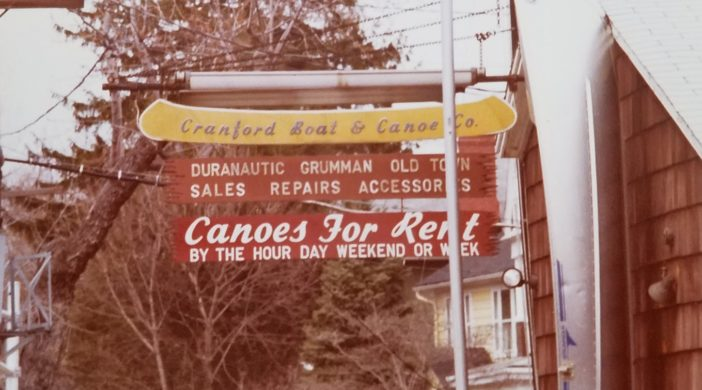
This sign image was taken back in the late 1970s

The Cranford Canoe Club, also known as the Cranford Boat & Canoe Company, is one of the oldest canoe clubs in the United States. Its current location at 250 Springfield Avenue and the corner of Orange Avenue is considered one of the earliest Canoe Clubs. Founded in 1908, the establishment has gone through numerous private owners. A map from 1922 shows two Canoe Clubs. The second canoe club was erected across the street where a current park and tennis court exists.

In 1990, Cranford purchased the facility and property with Green Acres funding. The property was agreed to be purchased from Frank Betz of Westfield in 1990 with the transaction closing in 1992. Mr. Betz owned the facility for 20 years and created one of the largest retail small boat dealerships in the country. Betz purchased the facility in 1972 from Cranford resident George Apgar. Cranford's nickname as the "Venice of New Jersey" makes it only fitting that it has a canoe club operating in the township. The township has leased the property and livery service to a third party that still functions today, renting canoes and kayaks on the bank of the Rahway River.

=== Revolutionary War Cantonment Site ===
Located at Sperry Park on Riverside Drive, a marker commemorates the winter of 1779-80 cantonment of Continental Army troops during the Revolutionary War along the river here, part of a 2,000 man front protecting George Washington's troops at Morristown. Here, Brigadier General William Irvine established headquarters of the forward defense line on January 1, 1780. The front stretched in an arc from Newark to Perth Amboy, with Crane's Mills (Cranford) in the center. Several Continental Army generals headquartered here. Alexander Hamilton visited the Crane's Mills cantonment and Hessian prisoners are known to have passed through here. The marker was placed by the Crane's Ford Chapter of the Daughters of the American Revolution in 1977.

=== Revolutionary Hospital Site ===
An American Revolutionary War army field hospital was located in the northwest portion of Crane's Mills from 1777 to 1780. The site is now part of the Union County College campus, near Princeton Road, roughly at the site of the Kenneth Campbell MacKay Library. The hospital was a log building similar to the reconstruction that can be seen today at Morristown.

=== The Old Red Schoolhouse ===
Located at the corner of the Old York Road (now Lincoln Avenue East) and South Union Avenue, a historical plaque erected by the Cranford Historical Society in 1935 marks the location of Cranford's first school built in 1805.

=== Lost structures of Cranford ===
==== IBM office ====
A modernist branch office for IBM was constructed in Cranford according to designs by architect Victor Lundy; The building has since been demolished.

==== Cranford Opera House Block ====
Erected by James Walter Thompson in the 1890s and designed by Frank Townsend Lent this structure, containing a theater for various performances was owned by William Miller Sperry before it was destroyed in a fire.

== See also ==
- National Register of Historic Places listings in Union County, New Jersey
- List of the oldest buildings in New Jersey
- Rahway River Parkway
- List of historical societies in New Jersey
