= Droescher's Mill =

- U.S. National Register of Historic Places
- New Jersey Register of Historic Places
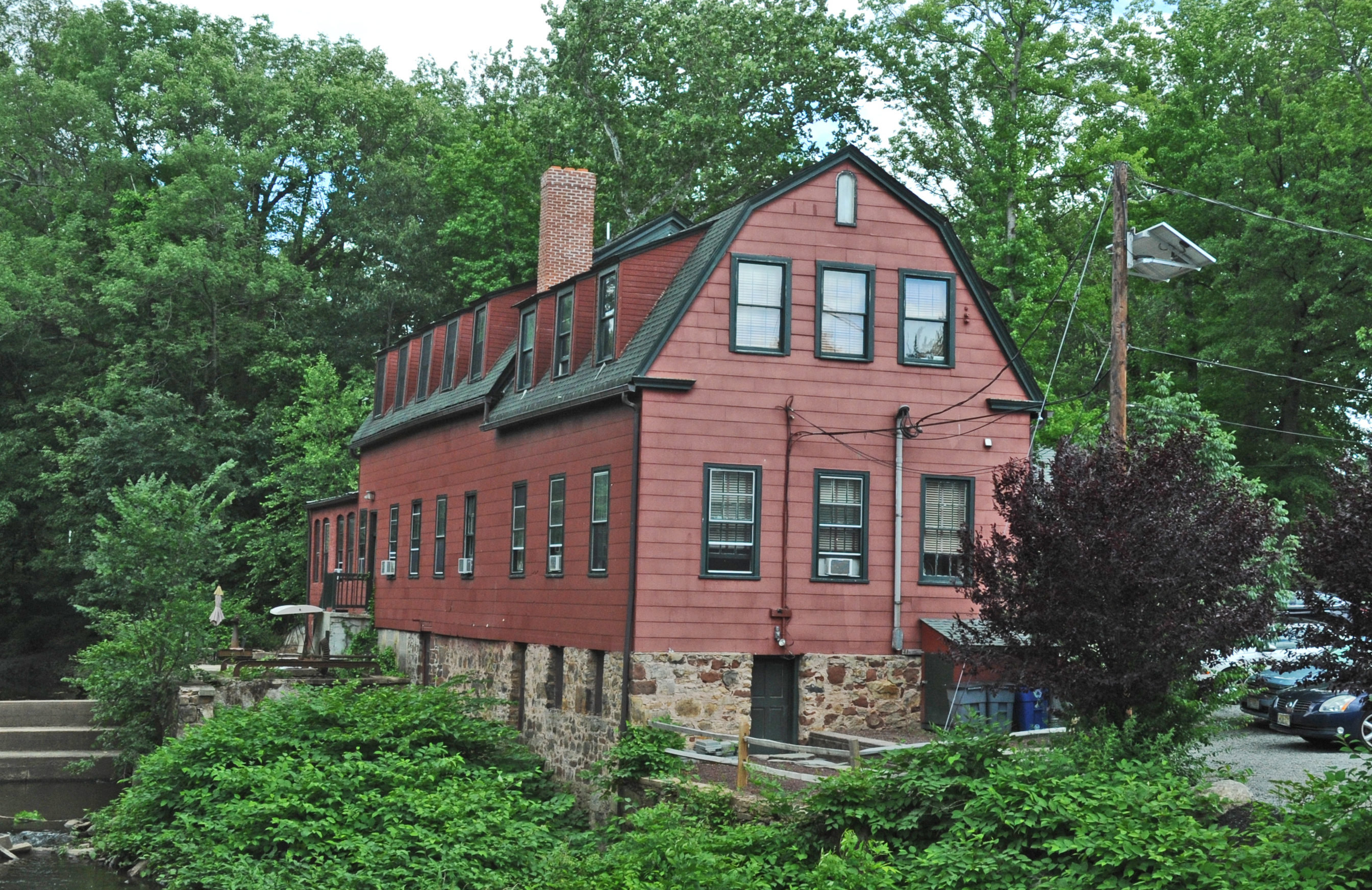

- Location within Union County, New Jersey Location within New Jersey Location within the United States
- Location: 347 Lincoln Avenue East, Cranford, New Jersey
- Coordinates: 40.6503°N 74.3012°W
- NRHP reference No.: 74001192
- NJRHP No.: 2653

Significant dates
- Added to NRHP: January 8, 1974
- Designated NJRHP: September 18, 1973

Droescher's Mill is located at 347 Lincoln Avenue East in the township of Cranford in Union County, New Jersey, United States. The mill was added to the National Register of Historic Places on January 8, 1974, for its significance in commerce. It is the oldest continuously operated commercial building in New Jersey.

== History ==
Also known as the Williams-Droescher Mill, Droescher's Mill is the last remaining mill on the Rahway River. It was constructed in 1737 by Benjamin Williams as a saw mill alongside a dam. Williams used the flow of the river to turn an undershot water wheel to power his saws. Lumber cut here went into the construction of the first houses built in the area. Shortly before his death in 1779, Williams erected a second building only a few feet from his sawmill for the manufacture of woolens.

In 1902, Severin R. Droescher bought the mill and renovated it into the structure as seen today. S.R. Droescher used it to run the Cranford Oil Stone Works where whetstones and oilstones were made. Stones were stamped with SRD under the Comfort and Quick & Easy brand names.

Lincoln Ave East and Lincoln Ave West, the road that passes through Cranford and on which the mill sits, was originally part of the Naraticong Trail, a route to the sea of the Unami tribe of the Lenape people. Lincoln Avenue was known as the Old York Road by the 1700s, a colonial road from Elizabeth to Philadelphia.

Aside from the Naraticong Trail, the Great Minisink Trail also passed through Cranford as a traditional Lenape route to collect marine foods at the shore.

== Rahway River Parkway ==
The mill and surrounding parkland are local landmarks along the Cranford section of the Rahway River Parkway, a nearly century-old greenway of parkland that hugs the Rahway River and its tributaries throughout Union County, New Jersey. It was designed in the 1920s by the well-known Olmsted Brothers firm, sons of the eminent landscape architect Frederick Law Olmsted.

The Cranford section of the parkway follows the banks of the meandering Rahway River as it flows south through Lenape Park, Nomahegan Park, Hampton Park, MacConnell Park, Girl Scout Park, the Cranford Canoe Club, Hanson Park, Sperry Park, Josiah Crane Park, Droescher's Mill Park (also known as Squire Williams Park), and Mohawk Park.

The "Friends of Rahway River Parkway," a nonprofit group, has been formed exclusively to encourage and advocate for the preservation, restoration and enhancement of the Rahway River Parkway, in accord with the Olmsted design principles inherent in its origins, and to promote appropriate public enjoyment of the Parkway.

Alluem Yoga, a yoga studio located in the mill, has organized Rahway River Parkway clean-ups on the stretch of the Parkway at the mill.

=== Cranford Riverwalk ===
The Cranford Riverwalk and Heritage Corridor portion of the Rahway River Parkway begins at the parklands near where Orange Avenue meets Springfield at the Cranford Canoe Club and follows the Rahway River on its path southbound to the mill.

== See also ==
- Cranford Historical Preservation Advisory Board
- National Register of Historic Places listings in Union County, New Jersey
- List of the oldest buildings in New Jersey
- Old York Road
- List of crossings of the Rahway River
