= Hawk Rise Sanctuary =

Ecological preserve in Linden, New Jersey, US

Coordinates: 40°36′17″N 74°15′00″W

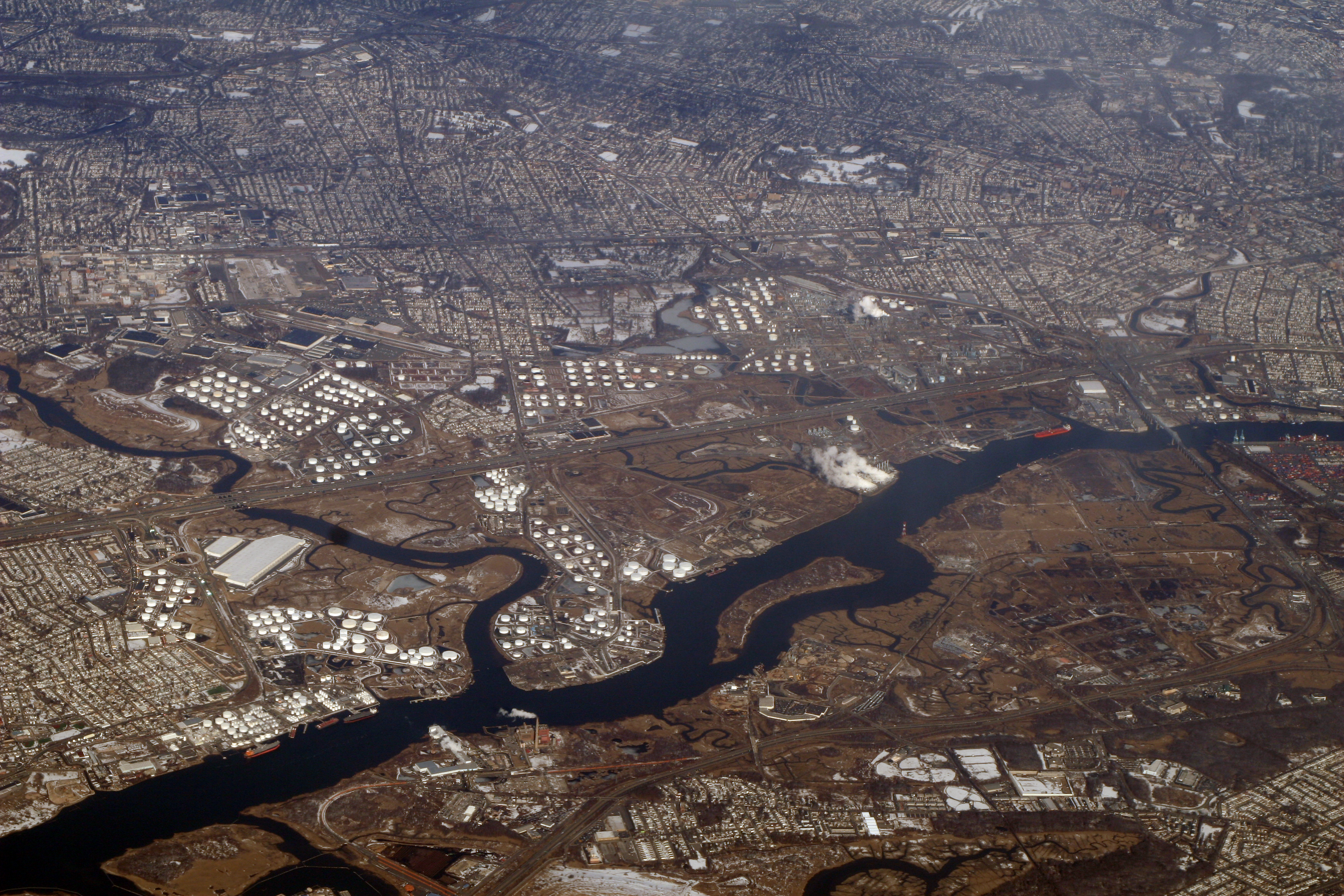
Hawk Rise Sanctuary is west/upstream of the New Jersey Turnpike, seen at left

Hawk Rise Sanctuary is a 95-acre (38 ha) ecological preserve and wetland complex in Linden, New Jersey, bordering the Rahway River. It is at the lower reaches of the Rahway River Parkway.

It was created in 2012 on a former landfill through the combined efforts of the New Jersey Department of Environmental Protection, the city of Linden and the New Jersey Audubon Society. The natural area was once hidden behind a variety of industrial land uses.

A boardwalk and scenic walking trail system winds through the Hawk Rise forest, continues along the edge of the former Linden Landfill, and leads to an overlook viewing of the Rahway River and adjacent marshes.

The site contains a surprising diversity of habitats for its relatively small size and urban location. These include forested wetlands, vernal pools, grasslands, shrublands, salt marsh, mudflats, a large pond, and the tidal Rahway River. 163 bird species have been spotted there.

In 2022, a solar farm opened on the site.

== See also ==
- Rahway River Parkway
- ExxonMobil-New Jersey environmental contamination settlement
