= South Branch Rahway River =

River in New Jersey, United States

Coordinates: 40°36′03″N 74°16′23″W

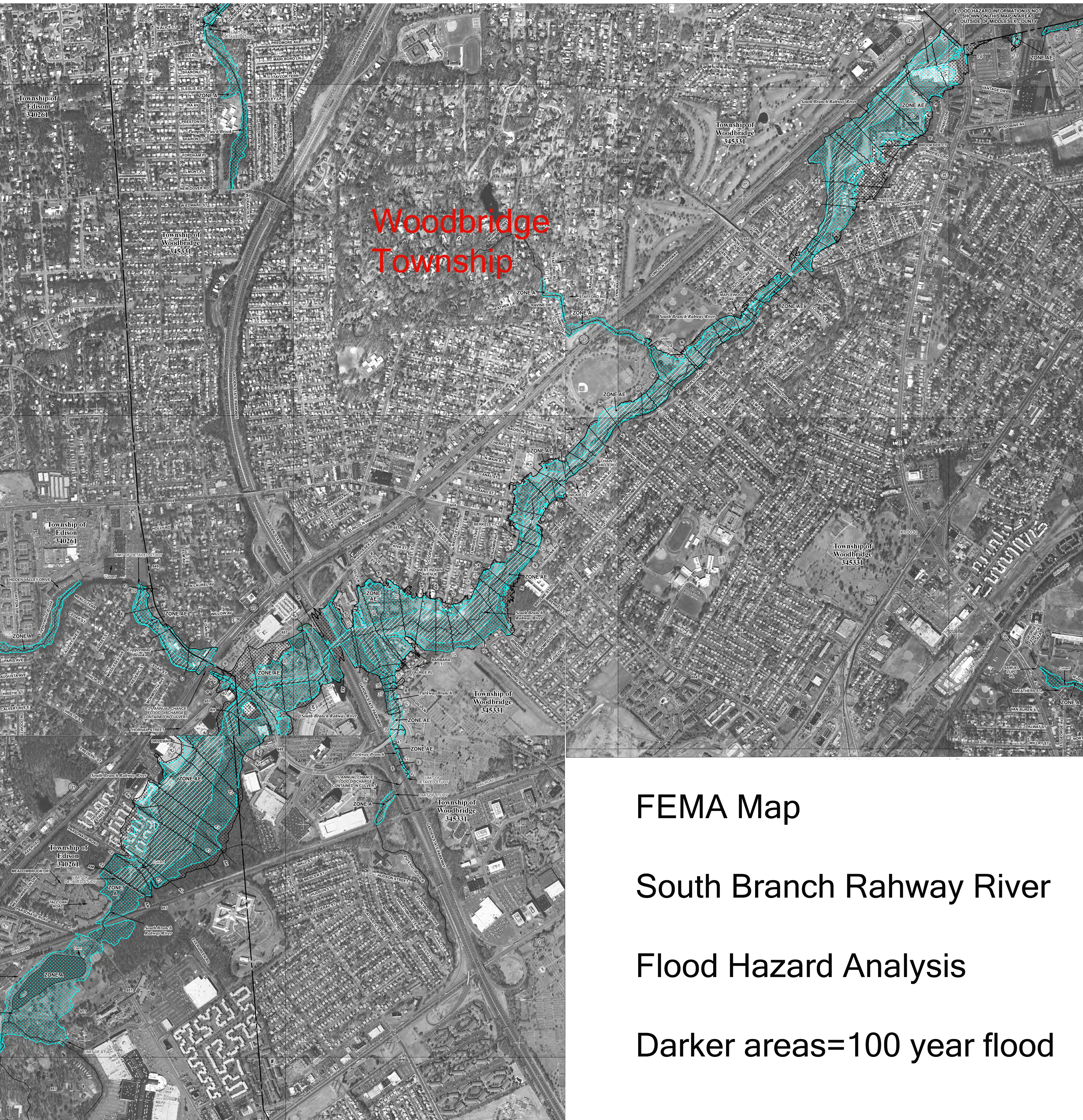
FEMA flood hazard map, Woodbridge, New Jersey

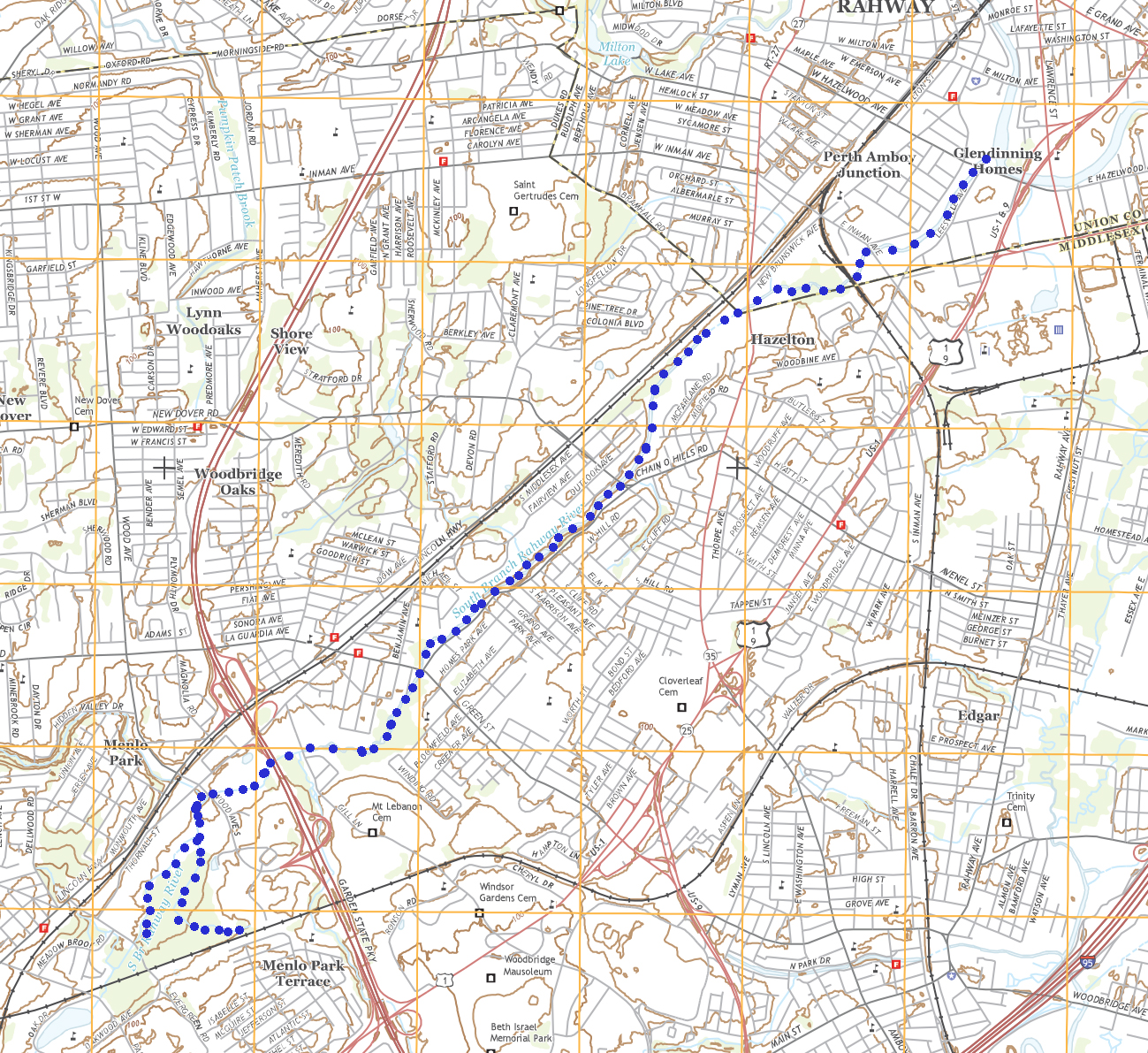
Map of South Branch Rahway River

The South Branch Rahway River flows north through Woodbridge Township, New Jersey before entering the Rahway River in Rahway, New Jersey, 4.5 miles from the Arthur Kill. Its source is the Roosevelt Park lake in Edison, New Jersey.

The South Branch is subject to both tidal and fluvial flooding. With coastal surges, the Rahway River can cause backflow into the South Branch as far as St. Georges Bridge in Woodbridge. Outflow from the south Branch to the main channel is inhibited by the "U" shape turn in the Rahway River and six bridge constrictions within a mile. The South Branch has an 11.6 square mile drainage area from "intensely developed portions" of Rahway, Edison, Woodbridge and Metuchen. Repeated "flashy" fluvial flooding in this river is a consequence of urbanization with impervious surfaces exacerbated by downstream channel constrictions, stream bank decay and steep hills. Fluvial flooding is felt to be the major component of flooding.
