= Rahway River Parkway =

Greenway of parkland along the banks the main stem Rahway River

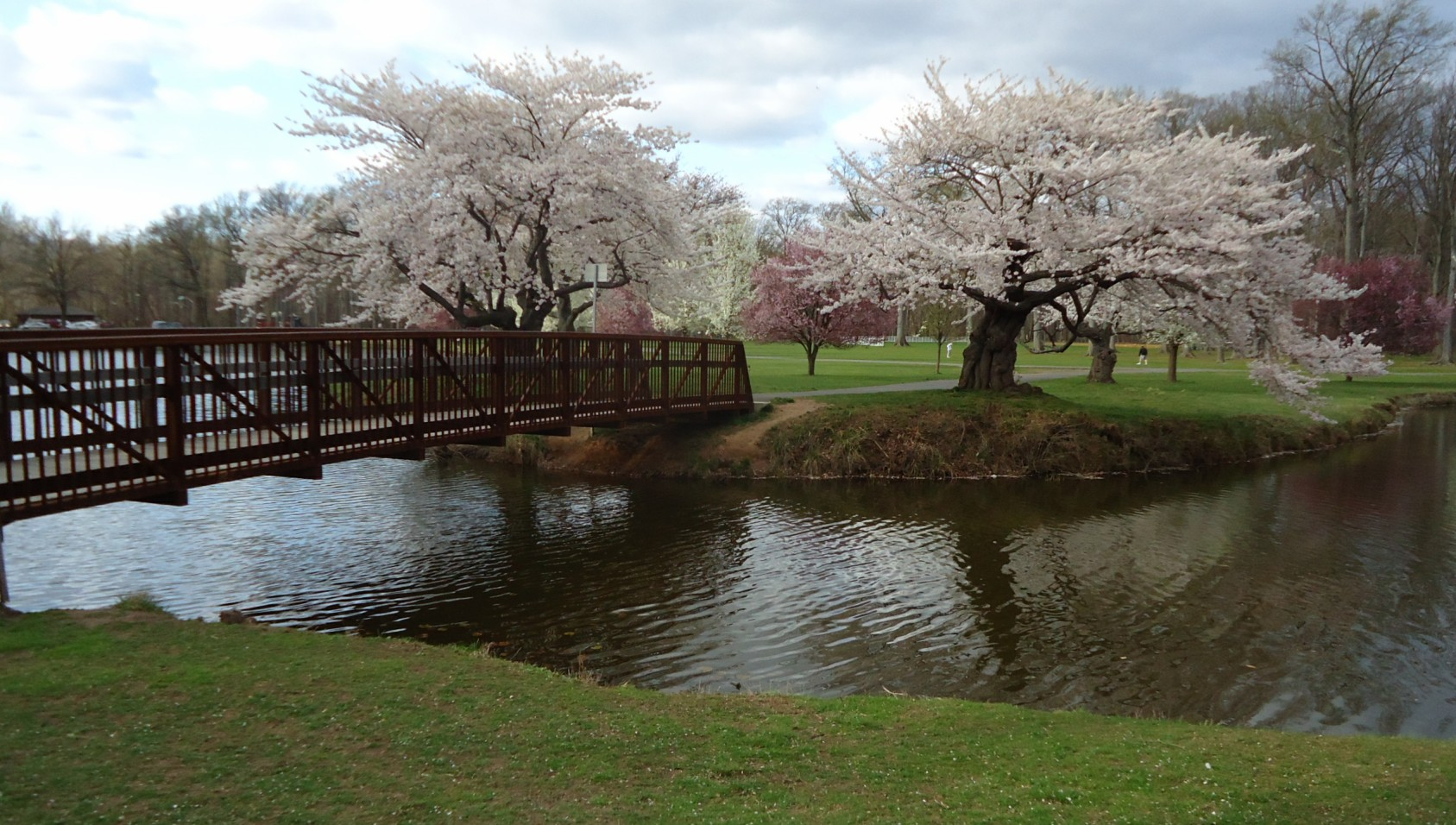
Nomahegan Park at the upper reaches of the Rahway River Parkway near Union County College

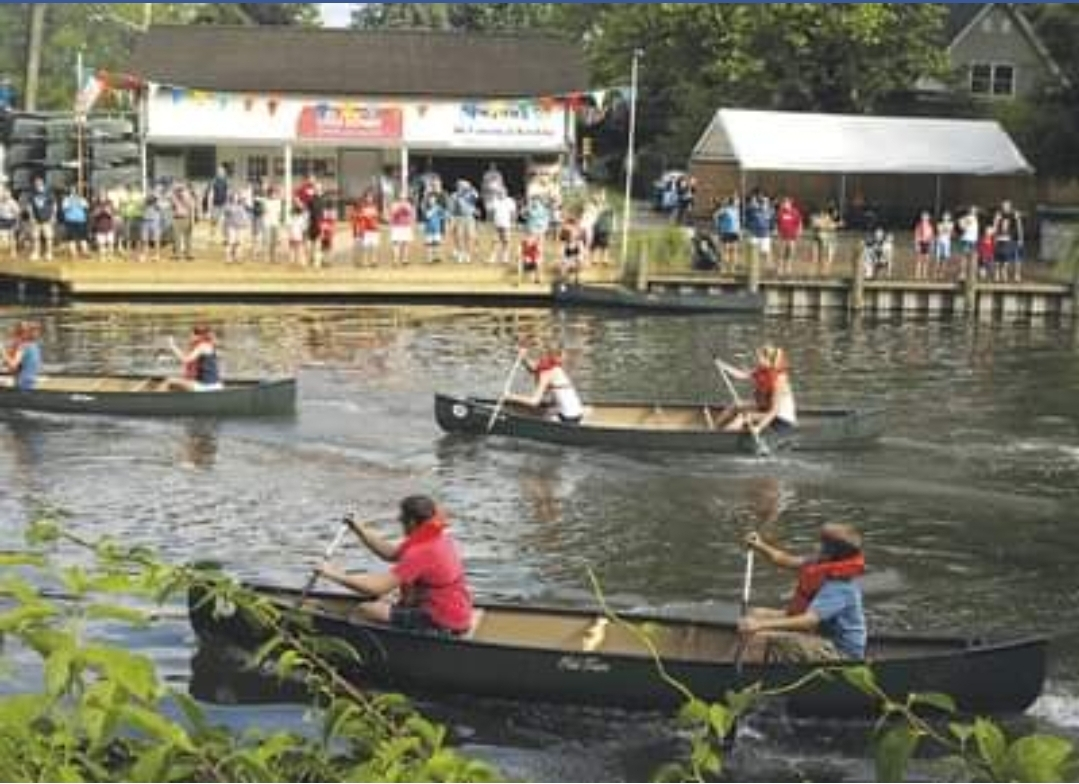
Paddlers race past the Cranford Canoe Club on the Rahway River during the annual Fourth of July competition in Cranford.

The Rahway River Parkway is a greenway of parkland along the banks the main stem Rahway River and its tributaries in Union County, New Jersey, United States. Created in the 1920s, it was one of the inaugural projects of the newly created Union County Parks Commission. It was designed by the Olmsted Brothers firm, sons of landscape architect Frederick Law Olmsted. The Rahway River Greenway plan expands on the original design. Many of the crossings of the river are late 19th century or early 20th century bridges.

The parkway intersects with the 7.3-mile main line of the abandoned Rahway Valley Railroad via abandoned rail trestle over the river, which some have advocated for converting to a pedestrian linear park and rail trail.

The East Coast Greenway uses paths and roads along the parkway. Sections of the parkway have been dedicated part of the September 11th National Memorial Trail.

== History ==
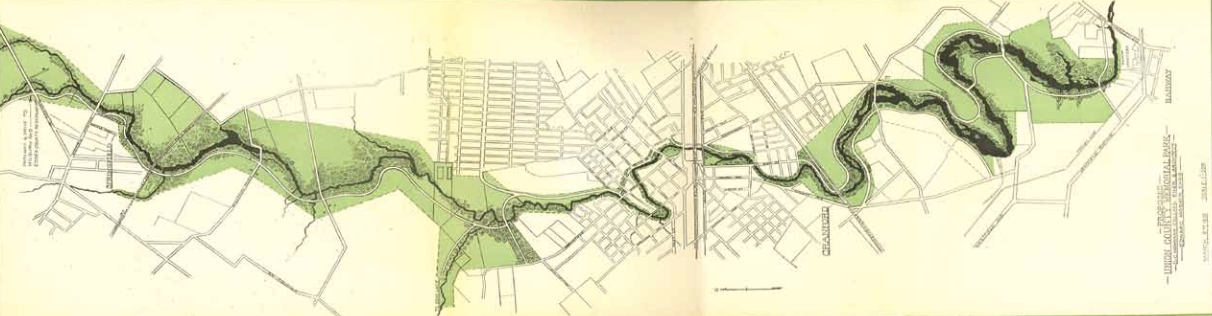
1919 map of original commission's study

The idea for the Rahway River Parkway started in 1919 when Union County Sheriff, James E. Warner began a movement to "save" the river by writing to the local paper, The Cranford Citizen, and urging that the river be made into a memorial to the young men who had died in the recent World War I. This was followed by editorials of support in The Rahway Record, The Westfield Leader, The Cranford Citizen, and The Chronicle. On May 5, 1919, the Elizabeth Daily Journal, stated that the idea was "a duty rather than an opportunity.” The Rahway Women's Club sent a resolution of support to the Union County Board of Freeholders.

The Elizabeth Chamber of Commerce had one of its members organize Union County Park Association to urge the creation of a park commission and April 1921, Superior Court Justice James J. Bergen was petitioned to appoint a temporary commission to study the feasibility of such a commission. On April 30, a temporary commission was named and given $10,000.00 and two years to complete the study. Within five months, the group finished the study and returned $8,391.00 of the funds. The emphasis of the report was to move quickly, before the available open space was gone. On the November 8, 1921, ballot, voters were asked to approve a permanent five-member Park Commission and $2.5 million to be spent at the commission's discretion.

The Parkway was created between 1921–1929 following the design of the Olmsted Brothers, sons of landscape architect Frederick Law Olmsted. Many of the crossings of the river are late 19th century or early 20th century bridges.

The Parkway was also dedicated to those who perished in World War I.

== Description ==
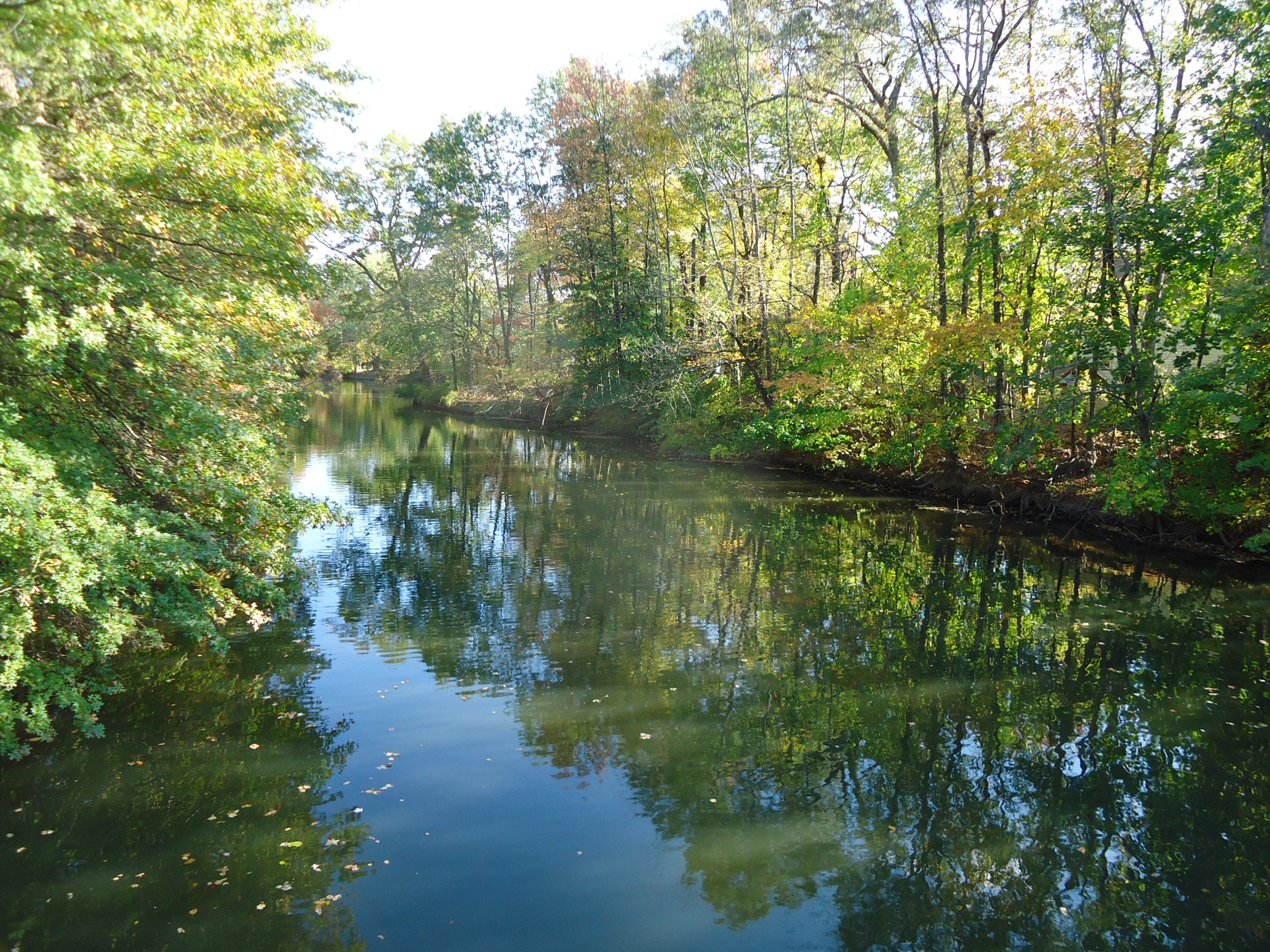
Wooded lands along Rahway River

The Rahway River consists of four separate branches that converge in Rahway, from whence it flows as a single waterway to its mouth at the Arthur Kill. The longest, or West Branch, courses for 24 miles from Verona. The East Branch rises in West Orange/Montclair and joins the West Branch at Hobart Gap in Springfield forming the main stem of the river. The Nomahegan Brook and Black Brook enter soon thereafter. The original Rahway River Parkway was approximately seven miles. The brooks and main stem through Union, Westfield, Springfield, Cranford, Kenilworth, Winfield, Clark, and Rahway (where it is joined by the Robinsons Branch and the South Branch) The parkway comprises several county, municipal parks, and trails along the banks of the river. some of which are part of the East Coast Greenway. The river continues into Linden, Woodbridge and Carteret, which also have parks along it, which are part of the 21st century Rahway River Greenway Plan.

== Parks and features along the Rahway ==
Park/Feature	Location	Coordinates	References/Notes
Larchmont Reservation	Union	40°42′35″N 74°17′50″W	
Rahway Valley Railroad Bridge	Union; Springfield	40°42′06″N 74°18′36″W	
Meisel Avenue Park	Springfield	40°42′09″N 74°18′49″W	
Black Brook Park	Kenilworth	40°41′04″N 74°17′42″W	
Echo Lake Park	Westfield; Springfield	40°40′33″N 74°20′32″W	
Lenape Park	Westfield; Springfield; Kenilworth; Cranford	40°40′43″N 74°19′00″W	
Nomahegan Park	Cranford	40°40′12″N 74°18′52″W	
Memorial Park	Cranford	40°39′41″N 74°18′27″W	
Hampton Park	Cranford	40°39′33″N 74°18′37″W	
MacConnell Park	Cranford	40°39′27″N 74°18′34″W	
Girl Scout Park	Cranford	40°39′36″N 74°18′24″W	
Cranford Canoe Club	Cranford	40°39′37″N 74°18′22″W	
Hanson Park	Cranford	40°39′36″N 74°18′17″W	
9/11 Memorial Park / Josiah Crane Park	Cranford	40°39′30″N 74°18′08″W	
Sperry Park	Cranford	40°39′29″N 74°17′42″W	named for William Miller Sperry; site of Crane-Phillips House
Droescher's Mill Park	Cranford	40°39′04″N 74°18′06″W	named for Droescher's Mill
Mohawk Park	Cranford	40°38′27″N 74°17′42″W	
Big Bend Lake	Cranford	40°37′48″N 74°17′52″W	
Bloodgoods Pond	Clark	40°37′48″N 74°17′52″W	named for Bloodgoods Felt Mill
Jacksons Pond	Clark	40°37′50″N 74°17′07″W	
Rahway River Park	Clark; Rahway	40°37′04″N 74°17′11″W	
Rahway Cemetery	Rahway	40°37′04″N 74°17′11″W	site of Merchants' and Drovers' Tavern
Squires Island	Rahway	40°36′55″N 74°16′32″W	
Bezega Wetland Observation Park	Rahway	40°36′48″N 74°16′27″W	
Robinsons Branch enters from west
Wheatena Park	Rahway	40°36′40″N 74°16′27″W	named for Wheatena
Lower Essex Street Park	Rahway	40°36′09″N 74°16′18″W	
South Branch enters from south
Waterfront Park	Rahway	40°36′01″N 74°16′16″W	
Rahway Yacht Club	Rahway	40°36′13″N 74°15′49″W	
Hawk Rise Sanctuary	Linden	40°36′17″N 74°15′00″W	
Joseph Medwick Park	Carteret	40°35′55″N 74°14′36″W	named for Joe Medwick

== Gallery ==
Rahway River

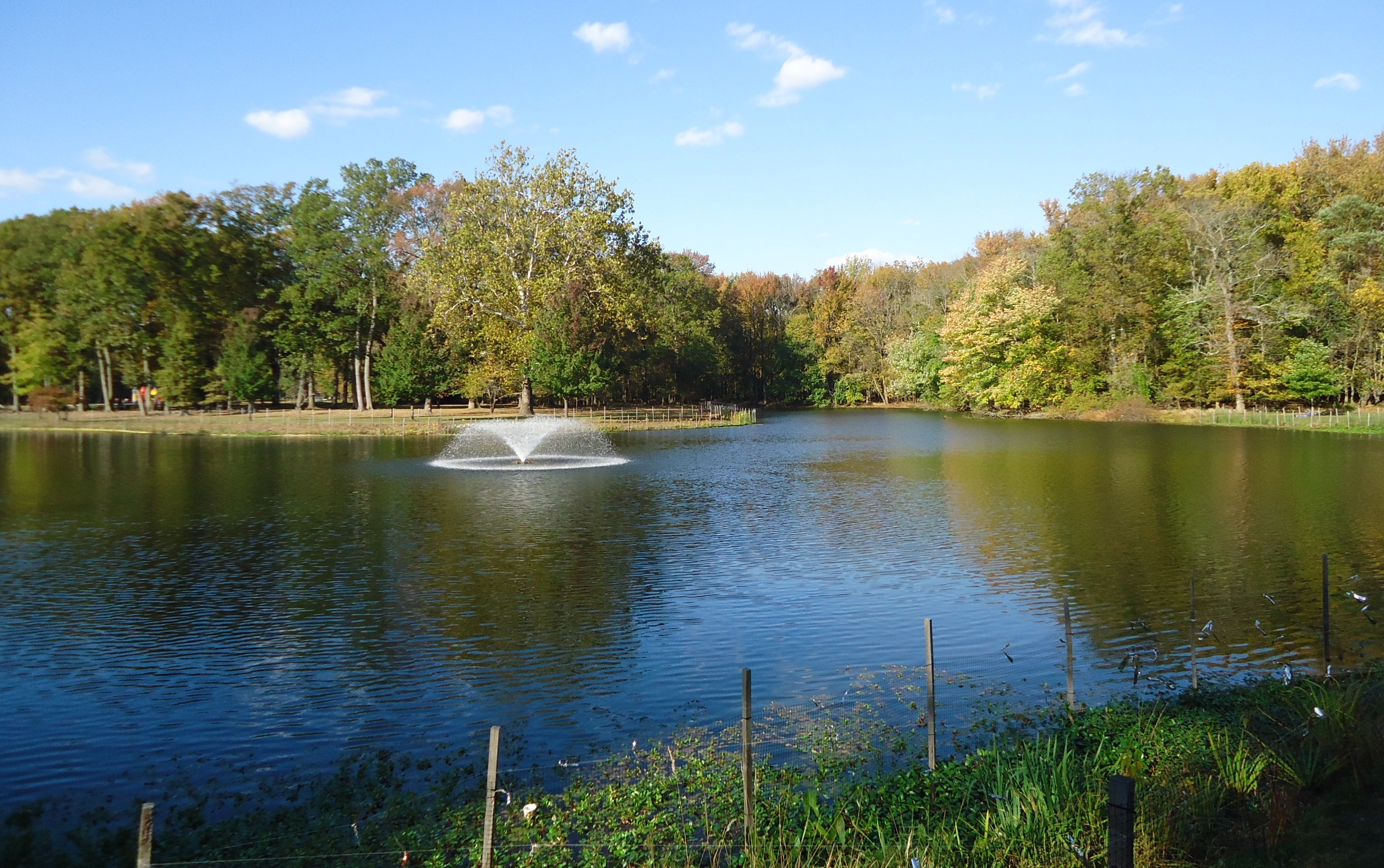
Lake Nomahegan

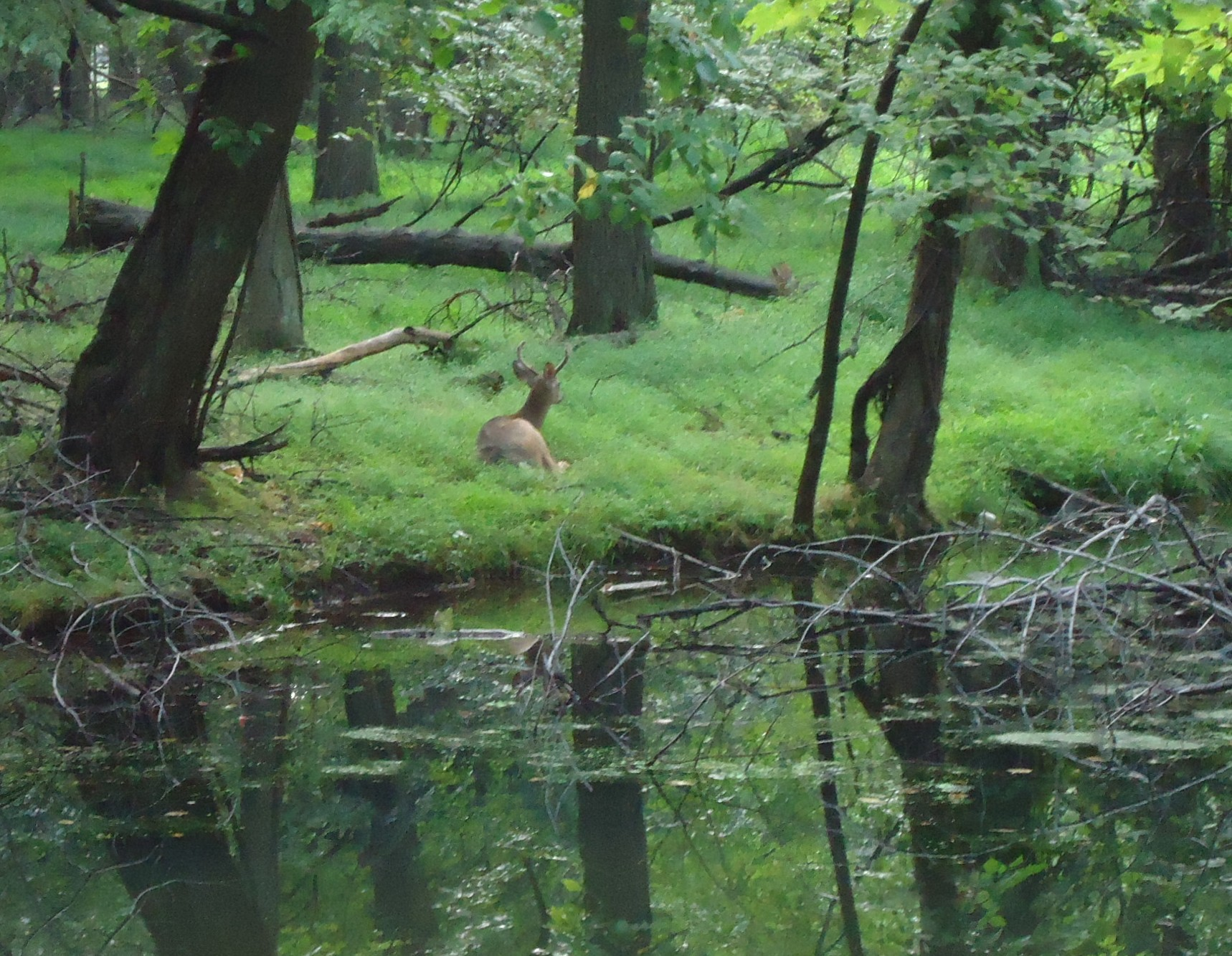
Wildlife in Springfield

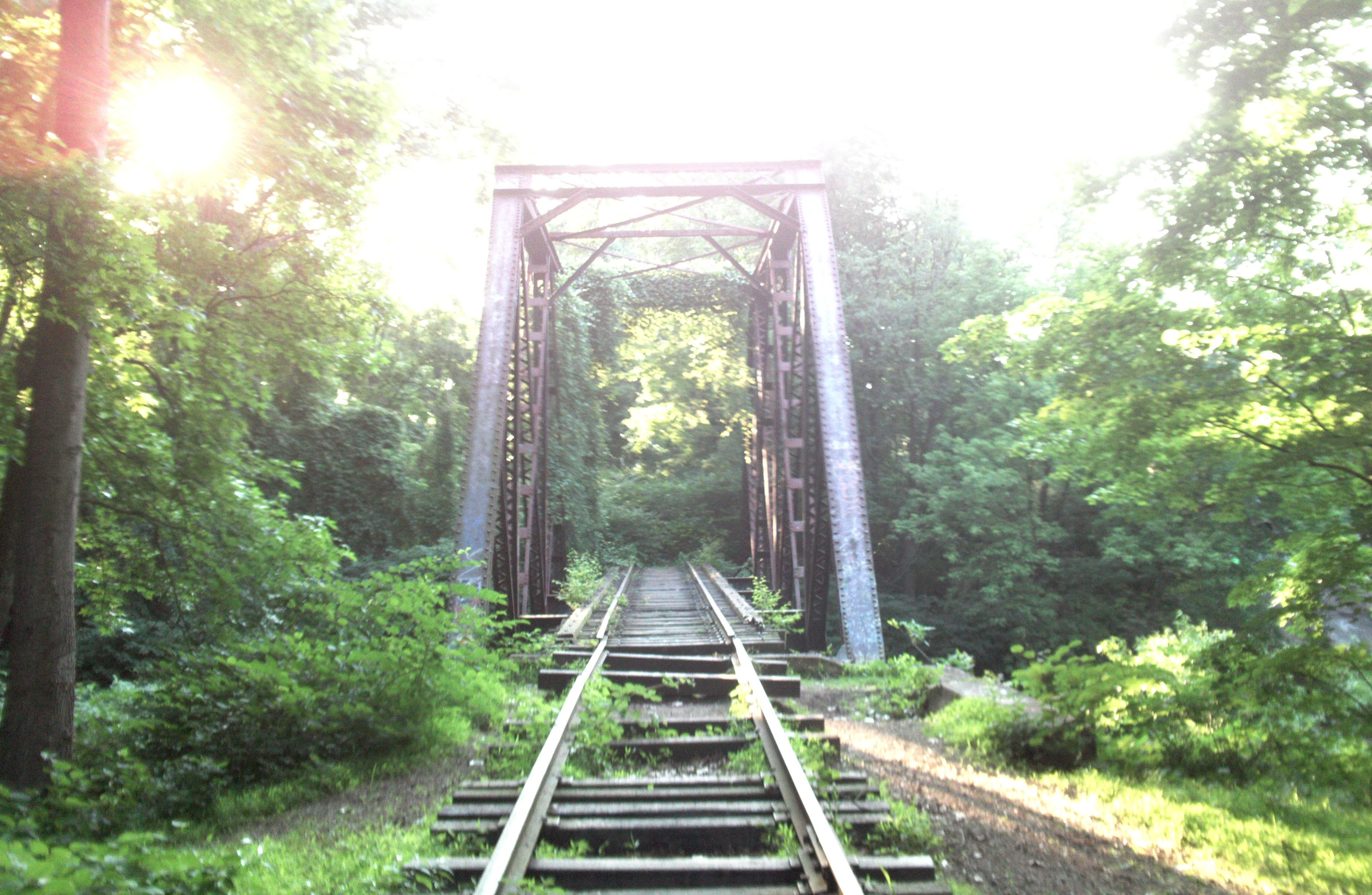
Rahway Valley Railroad Bridge

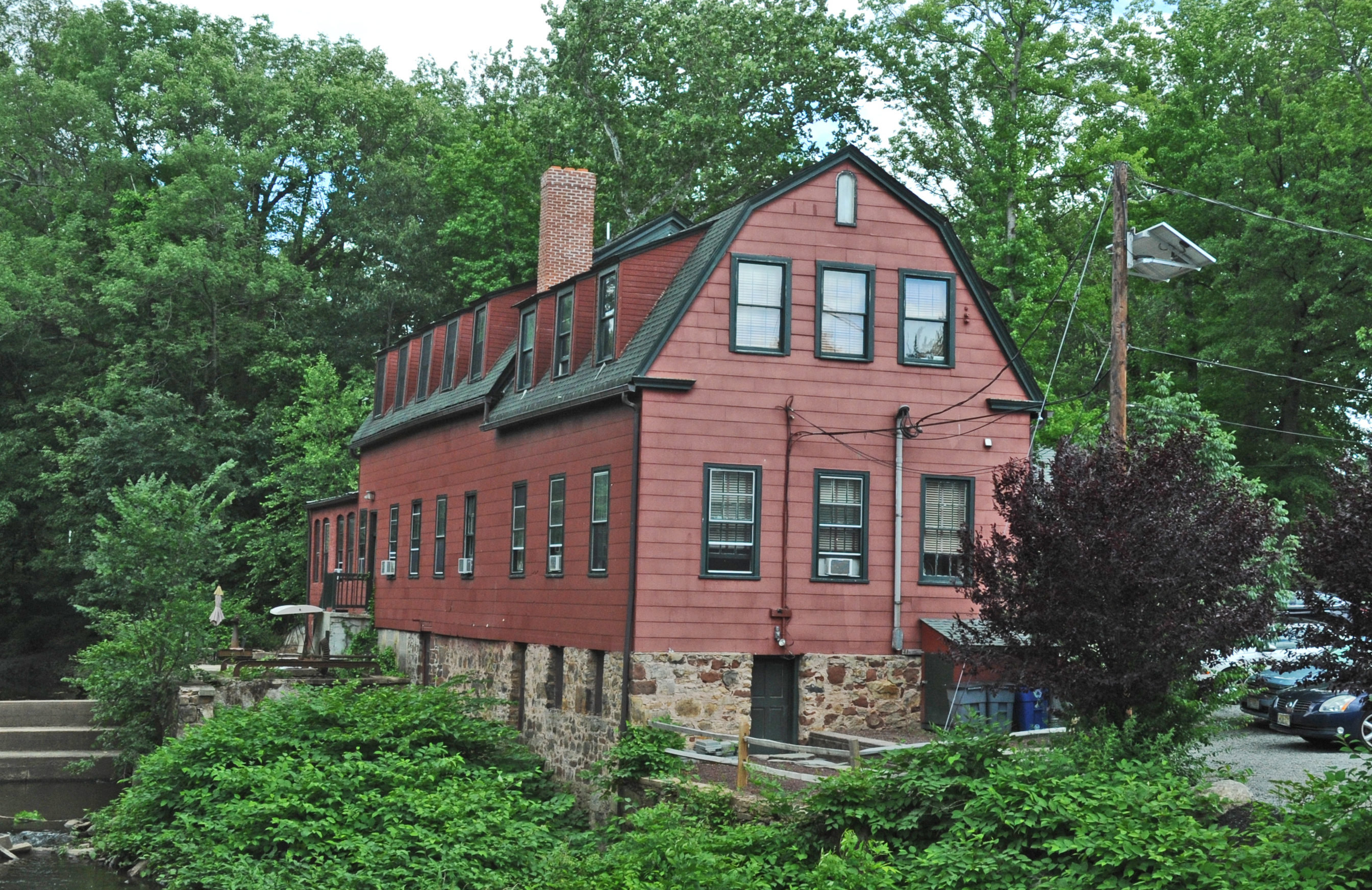
Droescher's Mill

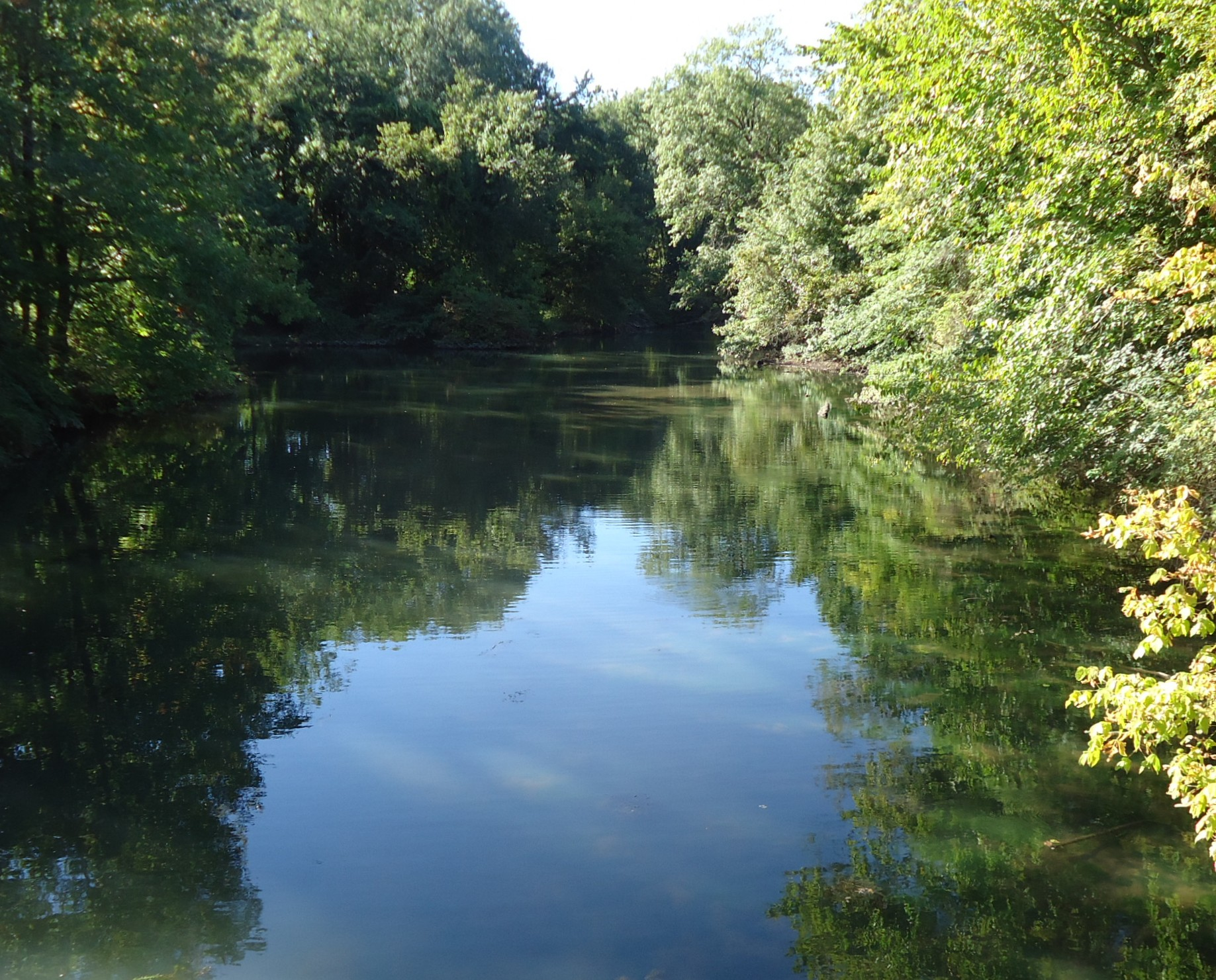
From footbridge in Cranford

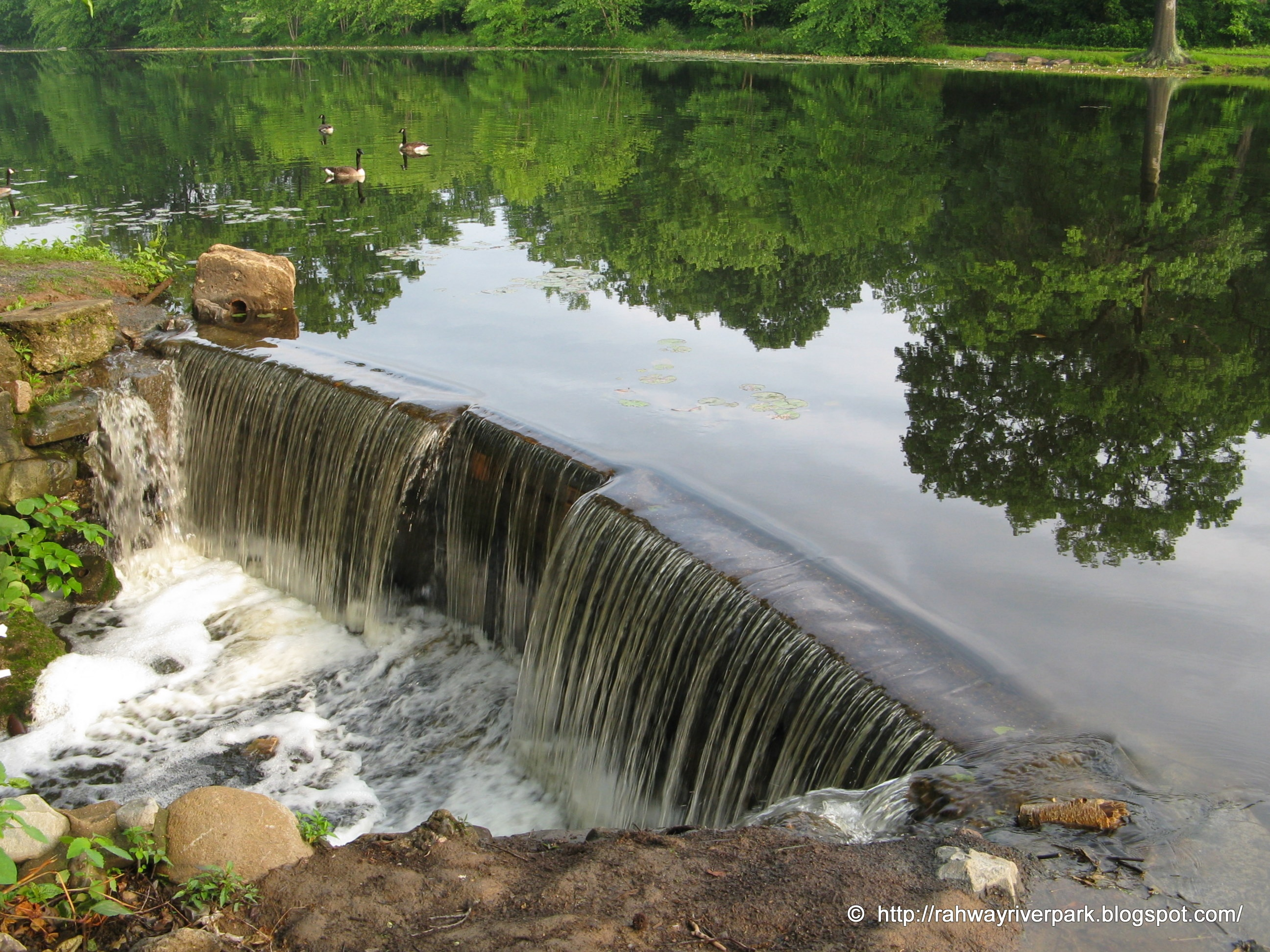
Dam in Union

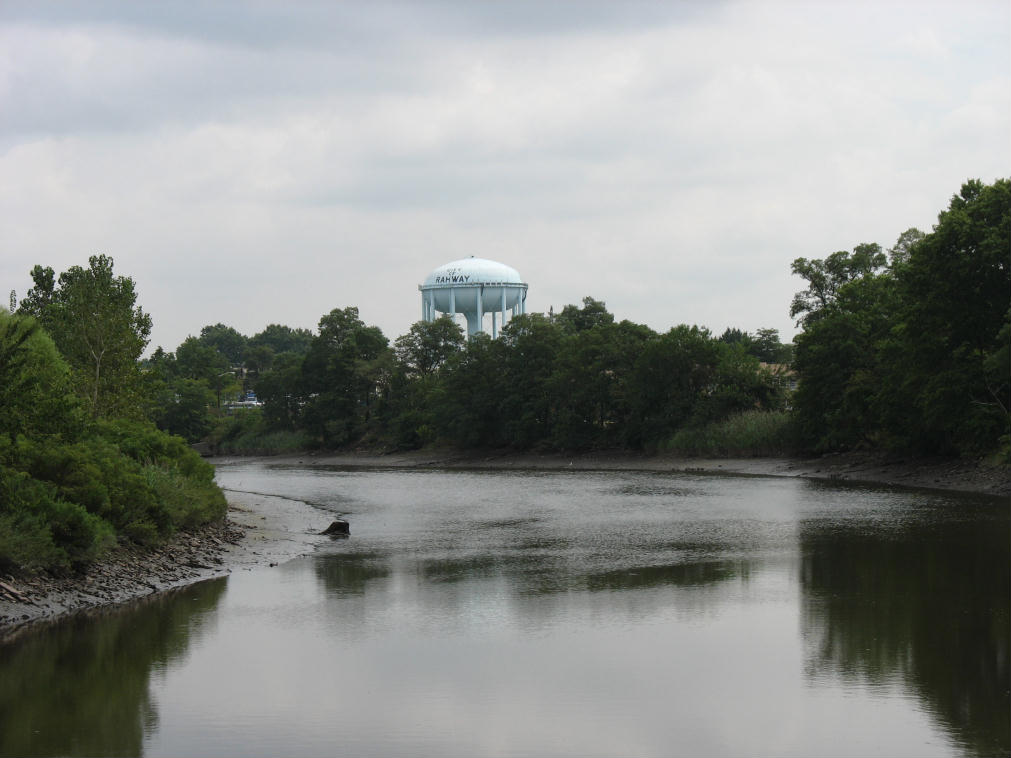
Rahway Water Tower

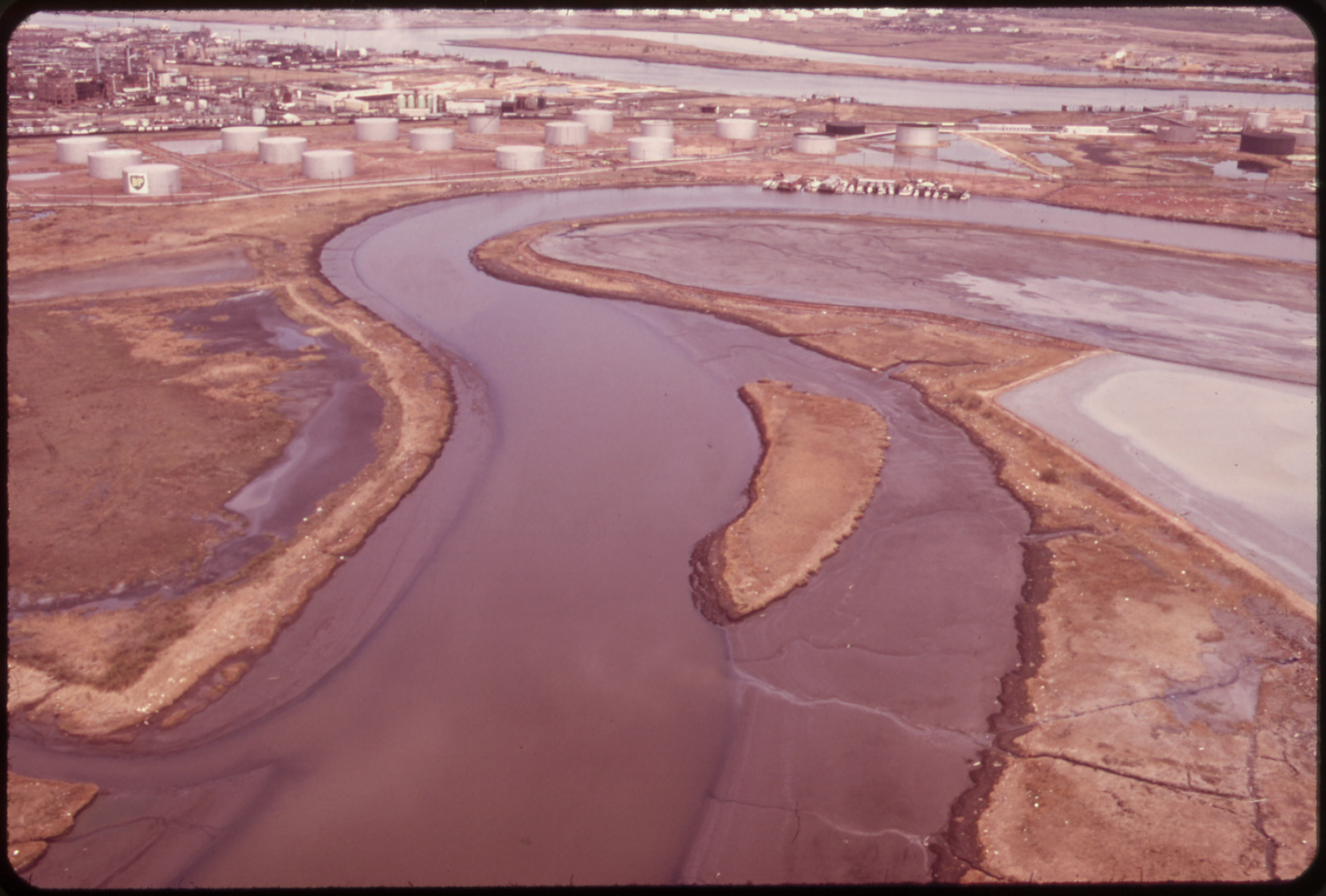
Tidal flats

== See also ==
- Union County Park Commission Administration Buildings
- Elizabeth River Parkway
- Warinanco Park
- Watchung Reservation
- List of crossings of the Rahway River
- City Beautiful movement
- Houdaille Quarry
- Historic sites in Cranford, New Jersey
- List of bridges documented by the Historic American Engineering Record in New Jersey
