= William Miller Sperry =

William Miller Sperry (1858–1927) is the namesake of the William Miller Sperry Observatory in Cranford, New Jersey. According to his sworn passport application, he was born on September 14, 1858, in Bristol, Tennessee. He moved to Cranford in 1898 and succeeded his brother Thomas Sperry as president of S&H Green Stamps. Sperry was the donor behind Sperry Park bordering the Rahway River in Cranford. The site is also part of the Rahway River Parkway, a greenway of the Union County Department of Parks and Recreation. Sperry's great-granddaughter, Frances Beinecke, is an environmentalist and the former president of Natural Resources Defense Council, and his grandson is William Sperry Beinecke.
