= Lenape Park =

Wildlife reserve and park in Union County, New Jersey

Coordinates: 40.655507°N 74.240713°W

Lenape Park is a 450-acre (180 ha) wildlife reserve and park that is part of the Rahway River Parkway in Union County, New Jersey, United States. The park is located in four towns: Westfield, Springfield, Kenilworth, and Cranford.

It is linked by a crosswalk to Nomahegan Park. The park encompasses stretches of both the Rahway River and Nomahegan Brook, and comprises one of the largest undeveloped properties in the Rahway River watershed. Lenape refers to the Native Americans who occupied the region; the names "Rahway" and "Nomahegan" are derivative of their language.

An approximately 4.5-mile off-road paved pedestrian path stretches eastbound from Mountainside Police Headquarters in Mountainside, through Echo Lake Park in Westfield, Lenape Park in Westfield and Cranford, Black Brook Park in Kenilworth, and ending near 505 North Michigan Avenue in Kenilworth.

The East Coast Greenway traverses the park. The French-Richards Burying Ground, which was established in 1724, abuts the park.

A small section of woodland trail exists behind Lenape Park pond.

== History ==
In 1921, a group of local citizens alarmed by the rapid industrialization of the area created the Union County Park Commission after referendum to purchase and preserve remaining natural areas.

=== Mastodon Site ===
Two tusks (one measuring 4 feet, 3 inches) and several bone fragments from an ancient American mastodon were found in June and August 1936 north of Kenilworth Blvd in what is now Lenape Park (other sources name the swampy area directly behind what is now the parking lot of Union County College's main building). Two Works Progress Administration workers digging an artificial lake in Lenape located the bones. The bones discovered are believed to have belonged to a young male that lived 12,000 years ago and probably washed down from farther north. They are the only known Ice Age mastodon specimens found in Union County, New Jersey.

=== Flood control ===
The raised terrain of Lenape Park was created mostly in the late 1970s. The park was redesigned by the United States Army Corps of Engineers (USACE) to respond to requests from neighboring communities to ease the cyclical flooding of the Rahway River to parts of Cranford, Westfield and others. The USACE built a large cement dam to control the flooding on Kenilworth Boulevard. The black-topped earthen berms, which now provide walking paths, extend to Echo Lake Park in the west and Black Brook Park in the east.

While the county's 1970s-era plans for Lenape Park envisioned hiking trails camping facilities, bicycle paths, some have complained about the absence of blazed hiking trails in the refuge given its size.

In 2011, studies began to fortify the levee system; a construction worker was killed during a roll-over of his trail-smoothing equipment. The USACE continues to study the flood control options.

== Flora and fauna ==
In 2005, a bioblitz found over 660 different species in the park.

== See also ==
- The Rahway River Parkway
- The Rahway River
