= Cranford Canoe Club =

Canoe club in Cranford, New Jersey, USA

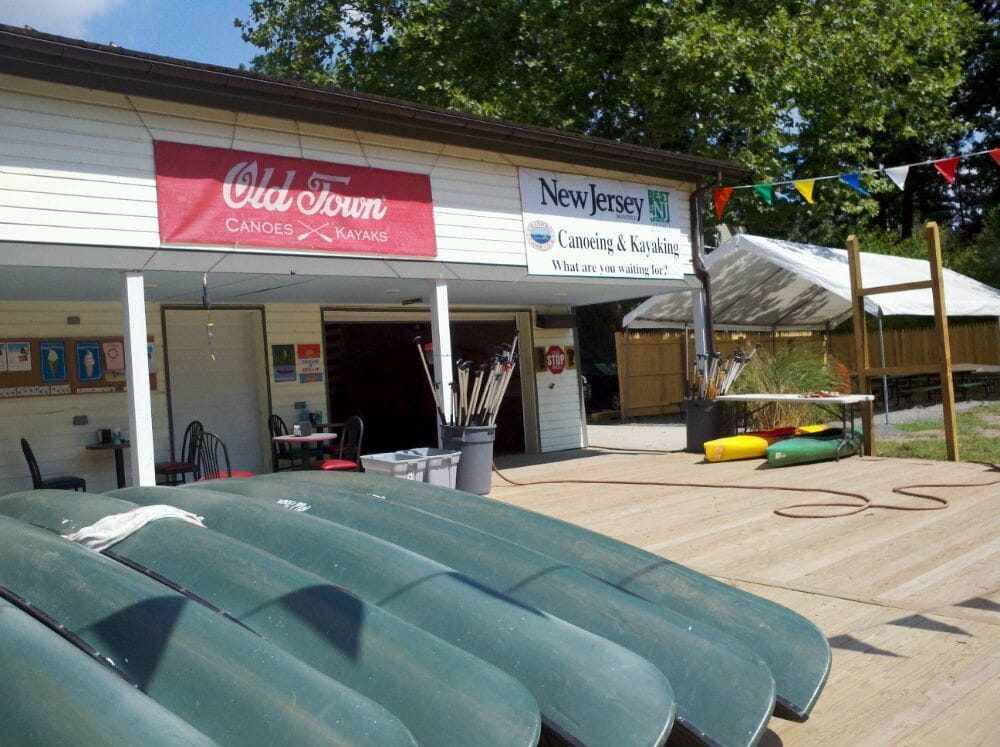
The dock at the Canoe Club which has served Cranford for over 100 years.

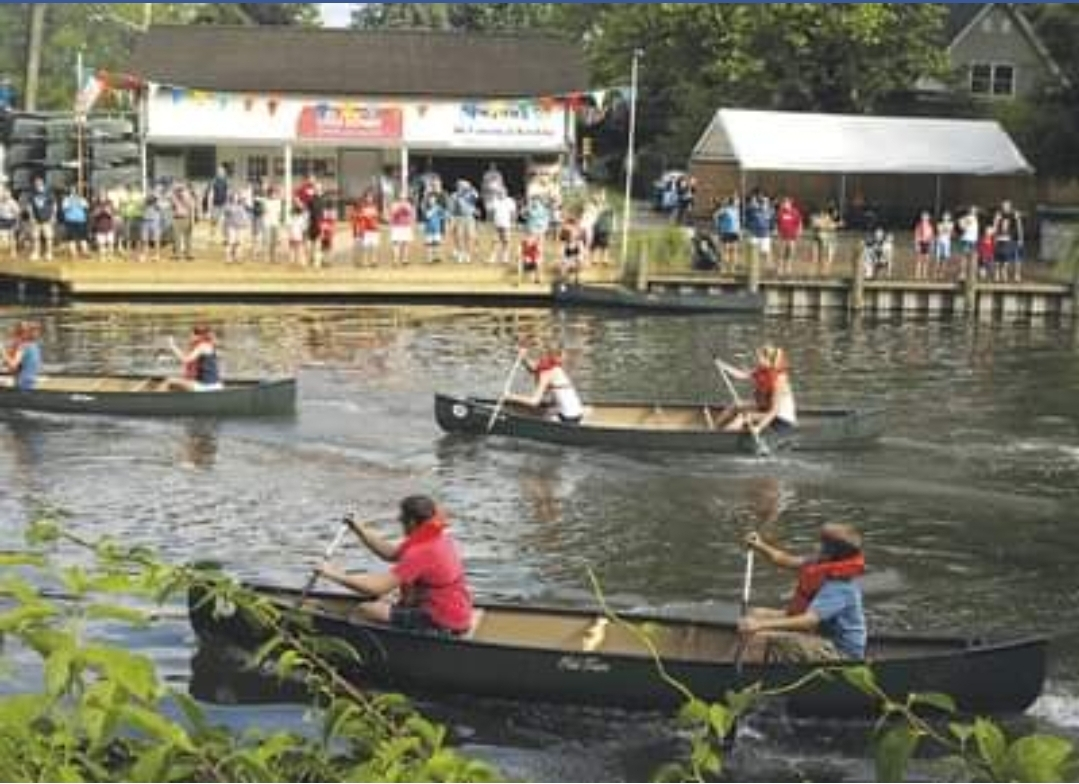
Paddlers race past the Cranford Canoe Club on the Rahway River during the annual Fourth of July competition.

The Cranford Canoe Club is one of the oldest canoe clubs in the United States and a community landmark known as part of Cranford, New Jersey's historic fabric and identity for over 100 years. The current canoe club, while not the first, is the last surviving canoe club on the Rahway River.

Cranford was incorporated as a township by an act of the New Jersey Legislature on March 14, 1871, from portions of the Townships of Clark, Linden, Springfield, Union and Westfield. Since the Rahway River is a fabric of the community there has always been an interest in water sports on the river. Cranford's nickname is the "Venice of New Jersey". due to the canoeists paddling along the Rahway River Parkway that meanders through the township.

The Cranford Canoe Club has gone through numerous private owners and is now owned by the Township of Cranford. While no longer a "club", the facility is located at 250 Springfield Avenue and the corner of Orange Avenue. There are maps that show another Cranford Canoe Club across the street in 1922. Various dates originate the Canoe Club in 1908 and 1907 while other documents date the club ba ck to 1886.

== Early 19th century ==
The late 19th century Cranford saw the formation of many informal boating/hockey clubs by its young men. The Cranford Canoe Club had its origins in the "Shanty Gang" which held meetings in A. Clark's red “Lobster Shanty” canoe livery at the intersection of Normandie Place and Riverside Drive. In 1904 or 1906 the Shanty Gang renamed themselves the "Skeeter Club". In 1908 the Skeeter Club formalized itself as the Cranford Canoe Club.

Beginning in the 1880s, the Cranford River Improvement Association/Club (CRIC) and other Cranford organizations held various water carnivals and regattas on the river. According to an 1886 New York Times article, the carnival's decorations illuminated the night: "nearly a hundred boats will be gaily decorated with sky lanterns, the river banks will be illuminated with colored lights, the bridges will be lit up, there will be bands of music and a display of fireworks." Novelist Robert Ferro described these carnivals in his 1983 novel The Family of Max Desir, centered on a fictionalized version of the river. At the Cranford River Improvement Association's first parade held from July 31-Aug 2, 1886 holding its first regatta at the Cranford Boating Club followed by a water carnival.

In the early 20th century there was a concerted effort by Americans to expand their recreation activity and spend more time outdoors. Organizations like the YMCA and parks were formed for recreational activities. Canoeing became popular because the Rahway River was a quiet slow moving river which was ideal for canoeing.

The first river carnival was sponsored by the Cranford Boating Club in 1880. In 1900, 40 police officers were sworn in to provide additional control for the carnival crowds. In 1911, after the carnival, a "black tie" event was held at the nearby Cranford Casino Country Club. The July 1916 carnival drew a crowd of 12,000. By July 1921, crowds were estimated at 21,000. In 1976, a carnival was held not at the Cranford Canoe Club but at Nomahegan Lake. The final carnival was held in 1980 celebrating Cranford's Centennial - it was called the Centennial River Carnival.

== Early 20th century ==
The original Cranford Canoe Club (C.C.C.) had a clubhouse and sold memberships. Members did not have to reside in Cranford but most did. Members typically met on Friday nights to discuss activities. CCC had their first regatta in 1906. At the second regatta on Saturday, July 27, 1907, there were multiple canoe clubs participating including the Skeeter Canoe Club (Cranford), the Passiac Canoe Club, The Ulhigh Canoe Club (Cranford) and others. Events included Women's winner Miss Bessie Merriam who won a canoe back rest. Men's winner Alfred Clark, president of the Skeeter Canoe Club of Cranford won a paddle.

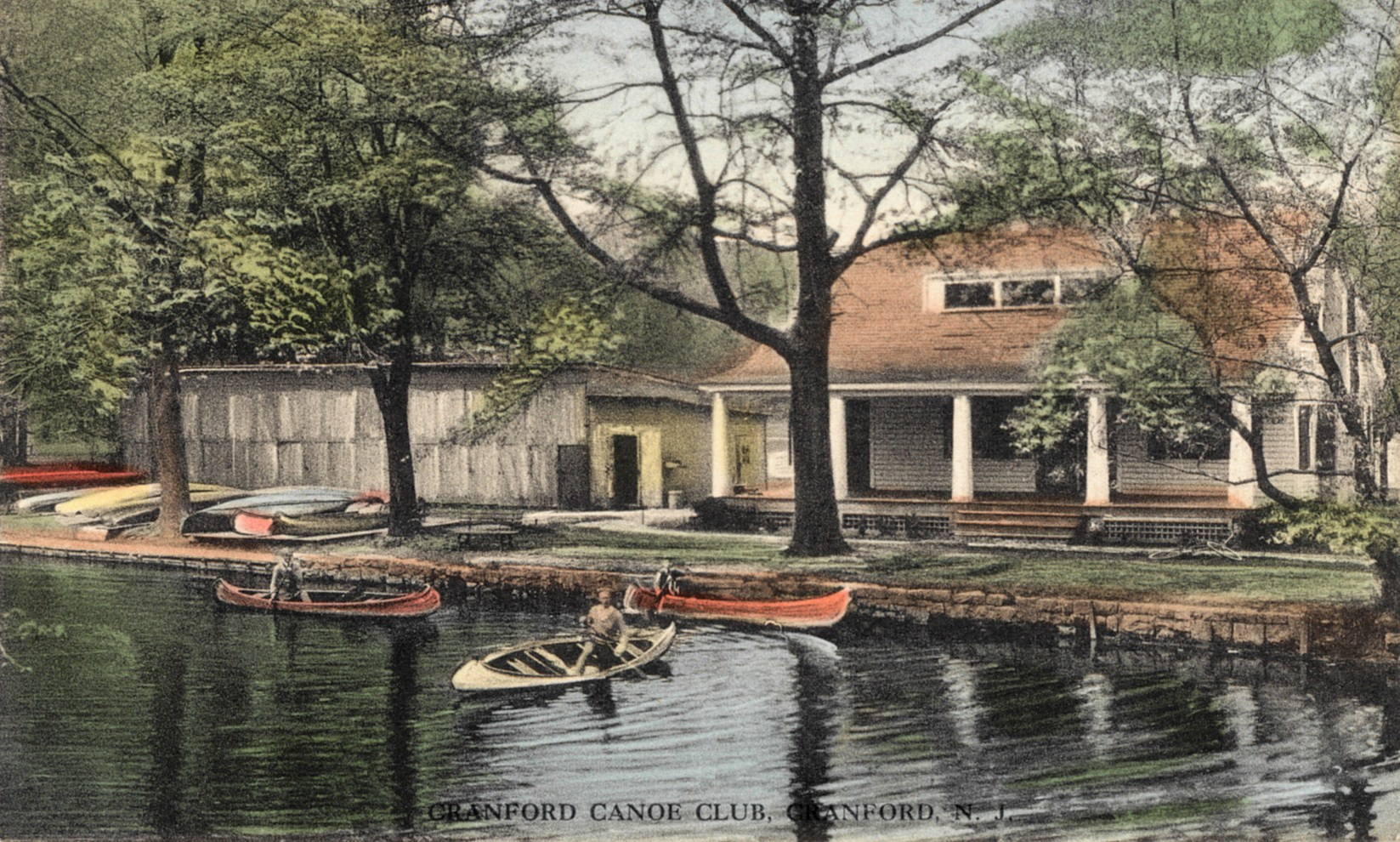
The early Cranford Canoe Club shown on the 1922 map is later known as the Girl Scout House, and the Cranford Canoe Club moves across the street to its current location.

At the CCC on June 5, 1908, a motion was passed "that flag memberships be established, flag members have the right to carry the club flag and to have the use of the club grounds, the racks and lockers for the storage of canoes and fittings." During the same week, the club docks and racks were completed and a rustic veranda was started.

Cranford Historical Society trustee Robert Fredlington says the Cranford Canoe Club was "the cream of the bunch," and moved into the current building, formerly owned by the Ulhigh Canoe Club, in 1934. In the spring of 1908, the Ulhigh Canoe Club building at 250 Springfield Avenue was erected and completed around May 15, 1908. At 2 p.m., most likely on Saturday, May 30, 1908 (reported June 4, 1908) Ulhigh President Leeds of the club introduced H.H. Drake of Elizabeth who made an address reciting the club's history. Edwin O. Woodling gave the club a hearty welcome and every assurance of public support. A club pennant was presented; a brown and white flag with the initial "U" inscribed in an embroidered triangle. A regatta followed on July 4 with a loving cup presented to each winner. Prizes for the July 4 event, including the trophies and a bathing suit were put on display at Reay's Drug Store.

The canoe clubs from Cranford were competitive outside Cranford as well. In 1909, at the Hudson Fulton Regatta hosted by the Yonkers Canoe Club, both the Cranford C.C. and the Ulhigh C.C. participated. In the tandem single blade race, Cranford C.C's W.H. Wagstaff and L.L. Coudert came in 2nd overall while Ulhigh C.C. members J. Smith and W. Anderson came in 6th. In the "Club Fours" competition, Cranford C.C. members W.H. Wagstaff, L.L. Coudert, W. Drysdale and D.L. Dagget came in fourth overall.

The markings on the map above shows across from the current canoe club was also the Cranford Canoe Club, known later as the Girl Scout House. The location is now a public park. The Canoe Club at the current location (250 Springfield Avenue) is the one that is stated as being the older (on Cranford maps going back to 1908).

The 1906 ad to the right from the Cranford Chronicle shows the Lobster House Canoe Club selling Old Town brand canoes. In 1907 it was reported that C.Garner, Eric Anderson and Ernest Anderson started a canoe voyage that commenced August 12, 1907 at the Lobster House on the Rahway River, around the Raritan Canal, with Philadelphia being their final destination. The trip took one week.

Cranford Historical Society curator Robert Fredlington stated in an article that "there were as many as 18 canoe clubs along the Rahway River going as far back as 1889". In 1907, there were two canoe clubs along the Rahway River that had tennis courts. A 1922 map showed two canoe clubs across from each other. Local Historian Fredlington stated; "boys would start clubs, perhaps build a building or a lean-to for a clubhouse, then lose interest, and the club would either die out or would be reinvigorated by one or two people that had the funds to do it."

In 1917, the Cranford Canoe Club consolidated with the Casino Canoe Club. On February 28, 1924, the Cranford Canoe Club burnt down. In September, 1924 the newly designed Cranford Canoe Club was completed. The club also built tennis courts behind their new club house.

== Mid-20th century ==
On November 8, 1934, the Cranford Canoe Club began renting their club house to the Cranford Girl Scout Council which renamed it the Neva Sykes Girl Scout House.

In 1939, C. J. Collins of 10 Balmiere Parkway in Cranford, owned the Ulhigh Canoe Club at Springfield and Orange avenues. Mr. Collins took over the canoe club in 1915. The club got its name from an Indian word meaning "Crescent Moon" and started as a private canoe club in 1908. Members held races against the now defunct “Cranford Canoe Club” which at the time had been located across Springfield Avenue in what is known today as "Girl Scout Park". “There are from two to three miles of river available for canoeing at present. Starting from the Ulhigh Canoe Club, one could paddle under the Springfield and Eastman Street bridges, around the bend at MacConnell Park, under the second Eastman Street bridge, past Hampton Hall, under the second Springfield Avenue bridge and through the Normandie Park section. Some have gone as far as Kenilworth. The Ulhigh Canoe Club had 19 canoes in 1939, once owning as many as 50 in its heyday.

The property and facility across the street later changed names to the Neva Sykes Girl Scout House. The house was demolished in November 1964. There are no visible remnants of the original Cranford Canoe Club (C.C.C.) facility that would have been next to the today's Town clay tennis court facility.

== History of Canoe Clubs in Cranford ==
Canoe Club owners/operators based in Cranford, New Jersey

Lobster House - Corner of Springfield Avenue and Normandy Place

- Late 1800s - The Cranford Canoe Club had its origins in the "Shanty Gang" which held meetings in A. Clark's red “Lobster Shanty” canoe livery at the intersection of Normandie Place and Riverside Drive.
- 1906 - Ad showing canoe rental in Cranford Chronicle to the public. Telephone number was "54-L"
- 1908 - Ad shows rentals for $0.50/hr, $1 per 1/2 day to the public
- 1909 - Ad shows a special Old Town "Rahway River" edition canoe for $36. Second hand canoes as low as $12

Skeeter Canoe Club (up near Nomahegan Park)

- 1904 or 1906 - the Shanty Gang renamed themselves the Skeeter Club.
- 1907 - Alfred Clark - President Skeeter Canoe Club
- 1908 - Built and founded

Cranford Canoe Club (C.C.C.) : Girl Scout Park (across street). Membership supported / clubhouse

- 1906 - First regatta sponsored by C.C.C.
- 1907 - 30 members (men and women)
- 1909 - C.C.C sponsors the River Carnival
- 1909 - C.C.C Officers - J.A. Plummer (Commodore), W.B. Drysdale (Vice Commodore), F. de G. Sephar (Secretary), M.R. Marston (Treasurer)
- 1910 - The Cranford Canoe Club bought property on Springfield Avenue (across the street from the Uligh Canoe Club, site of the current Cranford Canoe Club, and built a club house furnished in Mission style oak furniture and a player piano.
- 1924 - Cranford Canoe Club burnt down -February 28, 1924
- 1924 - the newly designed Cranford Canoe Club was completed. The club also built tennis courts behind their new club house.
- 1934 - Cranford Canoe Club relocates across Springfield Avenue to 250 Springfield Avenue.
- 1934 - On November 8, 1934, the Cranford Canoe Club began renting their club house to the Cranford Girl Scout Council which renamed it the Neva Sykes Girl Scout House
- 1942 - Neva Sykes Girl Scout House and summer day camp (dedicated November 1, 1942) - Neva Sykes was a charter member and secretary of the Girl Scouts. Property was called "Neva Sykes Memorial Girl Scout House"
- 1945 - In February, 1945, Cranford Township took title to the Club house in lieu of $875 in unpaid taxes.
- 1964 - Girl Scout House demolished (November)
- Current - Girl Scout Park owned by the Township of Cranford

Ulhigh Canoe Club / Cranford Canoe Club at the 250 Springfield Avenue

Club Pennant - A brown and white flag with the initial U inscribed in an embroidered white triangle.

- 1908 - Built and founded Ulhigh Canoe Club - At Decoration Day Ulhigh C.C. President Leeds hosted the opening celebration. Club Captain was C.A. Gardner.
- 1909 - New Jersey Canoe Association formed at Ulhigh Canoe Club (February 18, 1909)
- 1915 - 1939 C. J. Collins - Owner/Operator (Ulhigh Canoe Club)
- 1934 - Cranford Canoe Club moves across street - Ulhigh Canoe Club closes.
- TBC -1972 - George Apgar, Owner/Operator
- 1987 - NY Times recognizes Cranford Canoe Club as a premier canoeing destination
- 1972 - 1990 - Frank Betz, Owner/Operator
- 1990 - 1993 - Township of Cranford/Owner - Brooks Betz/Operator
- 2004 - 2007 - Township of Cranford/Owner - Michael Pender/Operator
- 2007 - Current - Township of Cranford/Owner - Ralph Circelli Construction/Operator
