= Rahway River =

River in the United States

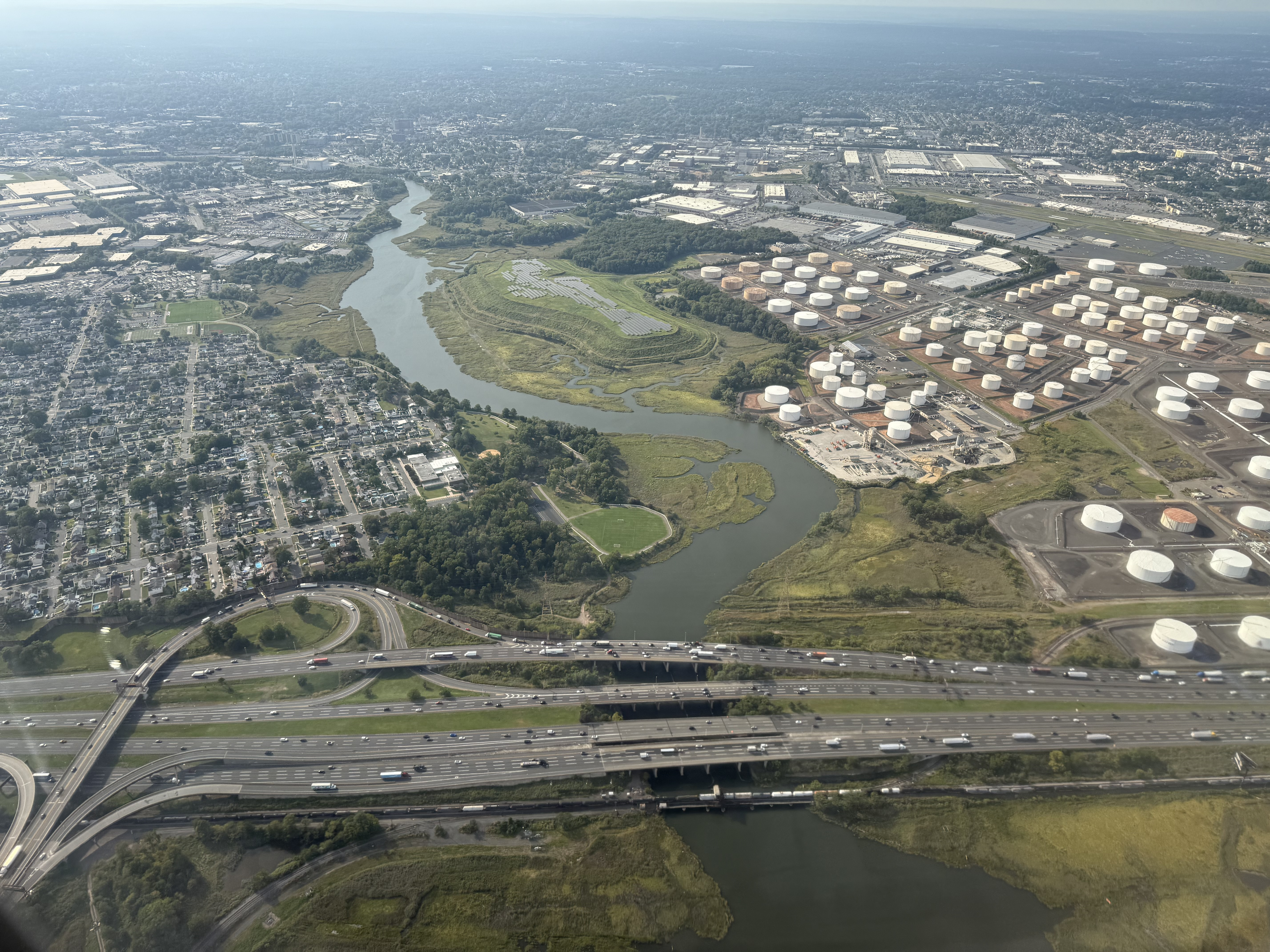
Aerial view of the lower Rahway River between Carteret (left) and Linden (right), with the New Jersey Turnpike (I-95) in the foreground

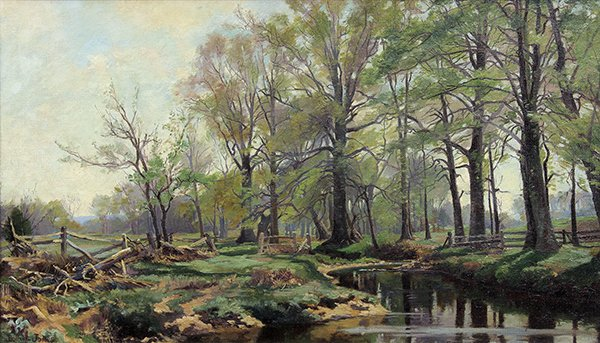
"Spring" by Hugh Bolton Jones. Painted by the artist in the mid 1880s on the Rahway River.

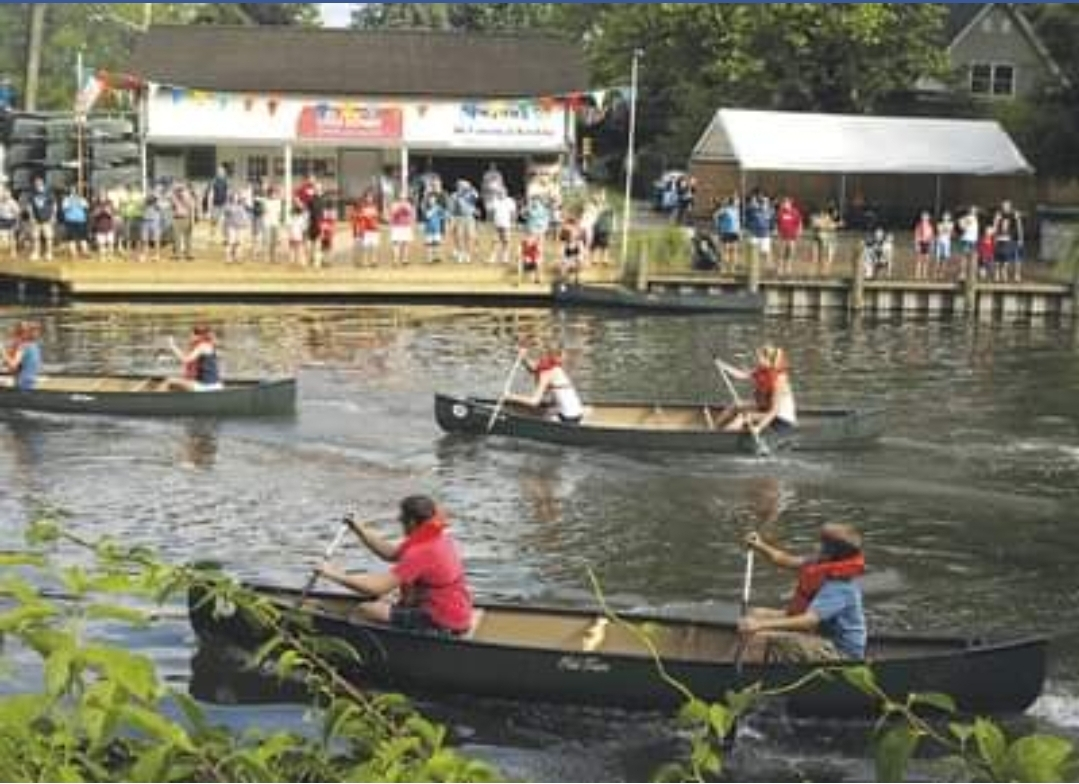
Paddlers race past the Cranford Canoe Club on the Rahway River during the annual Fourth of July competition in Cranford, NJ.

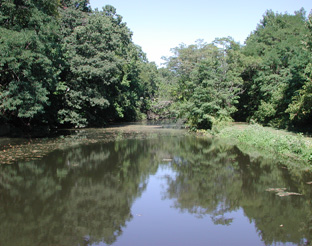
Looking northwest at City of Rahway water works, September 22, 2005

The Rahway River is a river in Essex, Middlesex, and Union Counties, New Jersey, United States, The Rahway flows into the Arthur Kill, the tidal channel between New Jersey and Staten Island, NJ.

Part of the New York-New Jersey Harbor Estuary, the river is approximately 24 miles (39 km) long. The upper reaches are lined with several parks while the mouth serves as an industrial access channel on the Chemical Coast.

The river was once on the lands of the Lenape Native Americans, and tradition states that the name is after Rahwack, a local tribal chief.

The river is the source of drinking water for the City of Rahway. Each spring, the river is stocked with approximately 6,000 trout.

== Route ==
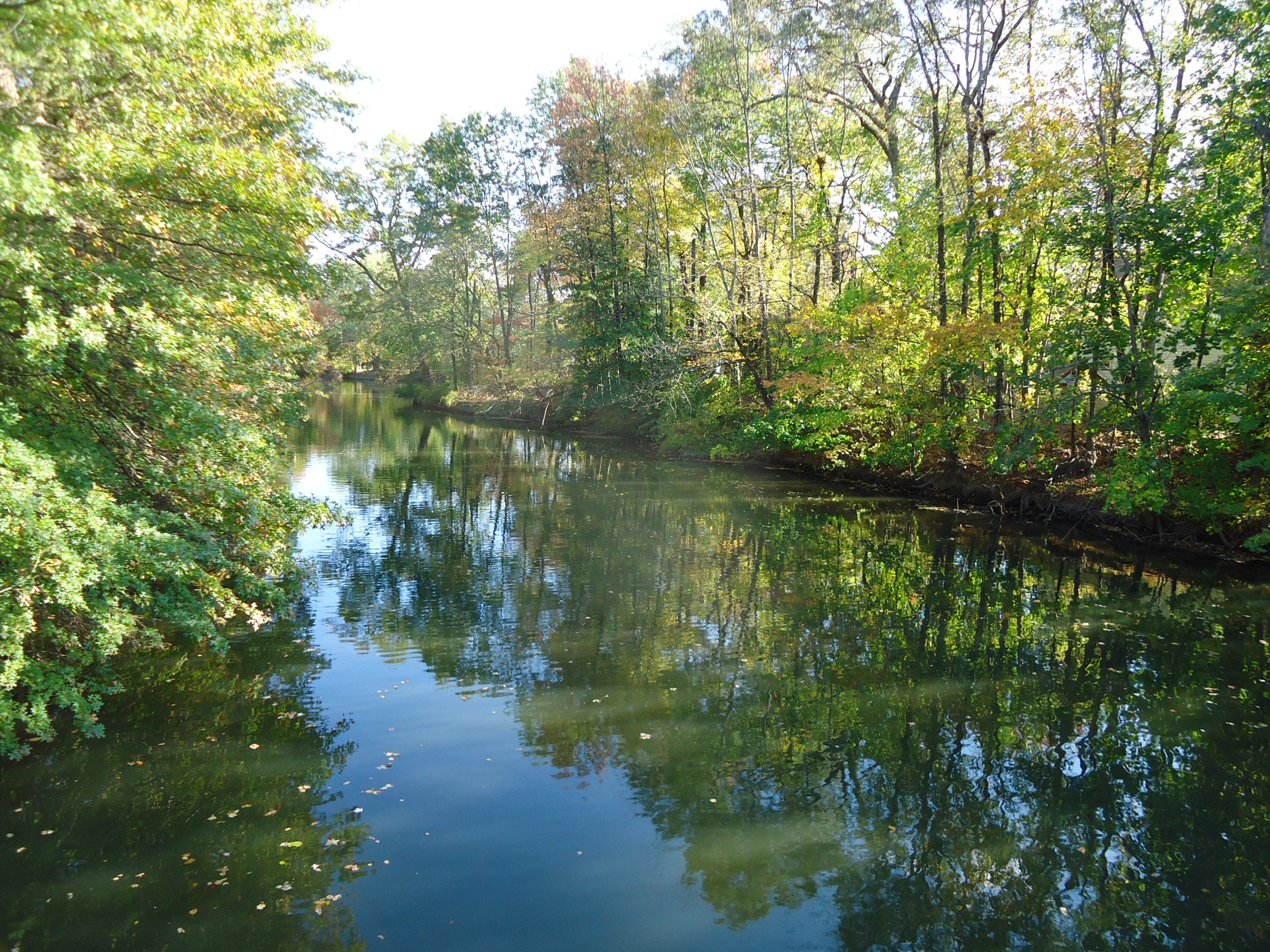
Rahway River in Cranford, New Jersey.

=== Branches ===
The Rahway River rises in Essex County as two separate branches. The West Branch begins at spring-fed Crystal Lake in West Orange and flows south through the South Mountain Reservation in the valley between first and second ridges of the Watchung Mountains. It runs directly through downtown Millburn. The East Branch rises as a surface stream in West Orange and forms part of the boundary between West Orange and Orange, then travels through the towns of South Orange and Maplewood. The two branches meet at Hobart Gap near Interstate 78, continuing south through the Union County communities of Springfield, Union, Cranford and Clark. In Rahway the river receives the Robinson's Branch and South Branch, which are approximately 10 miles (16 km) long. Before the creation of Union County, Robinson's Branch was the area's border between Essex and Middlesex Counties. The South Branch starts in Roosevelt Park in Edison behind the Menlo Park Mall, and flows through Edison, Iselin, and Rahway. The river's mouth is at the Arthur Kill between Carteret (on the south) and Linden (on the north), opposite Port Mobil on Staten Island.

=== Tributaries ===
- Nomahegan Brook rises in Mountainside along Route 22 near its intersection with Lawrence Avenue. It flows Easterly and parallels Route 22 through Westfield and Cranford, where it meets the Rahway River. Along the way, it receives five unnamed tributaries which all arise on the Southern slope of the First Watchung Mountain.
- Gallows Hill Brook rises in Fairview Cemetery in Westfield, travels through Garwood and Cranford, and joins the Rahway River at Hampton Park
- Orchard Brook travels through Garwood and enters Cranford by West Holly where it joins the Rahway.
- Kings Creek, Cross Creek, and Marshes Creek joins the Rahway near its entry into the Arthur Kill

== Parks along the river ==
=== South Mountain Reservation ===
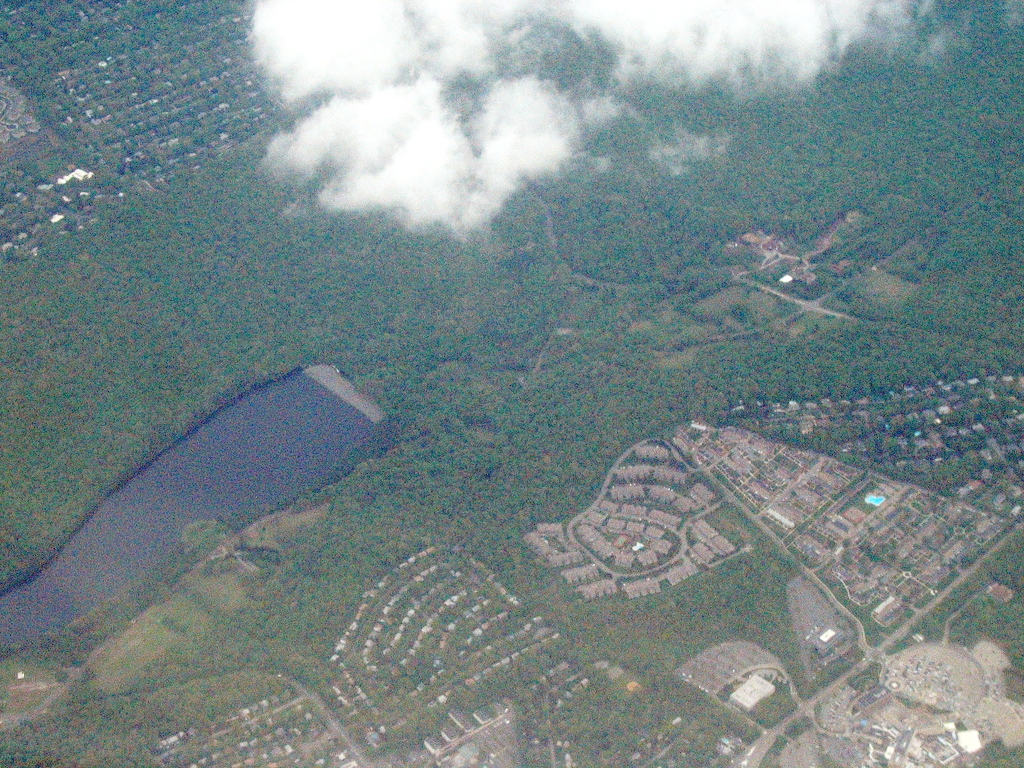
Aerial view of Orange Reservoir

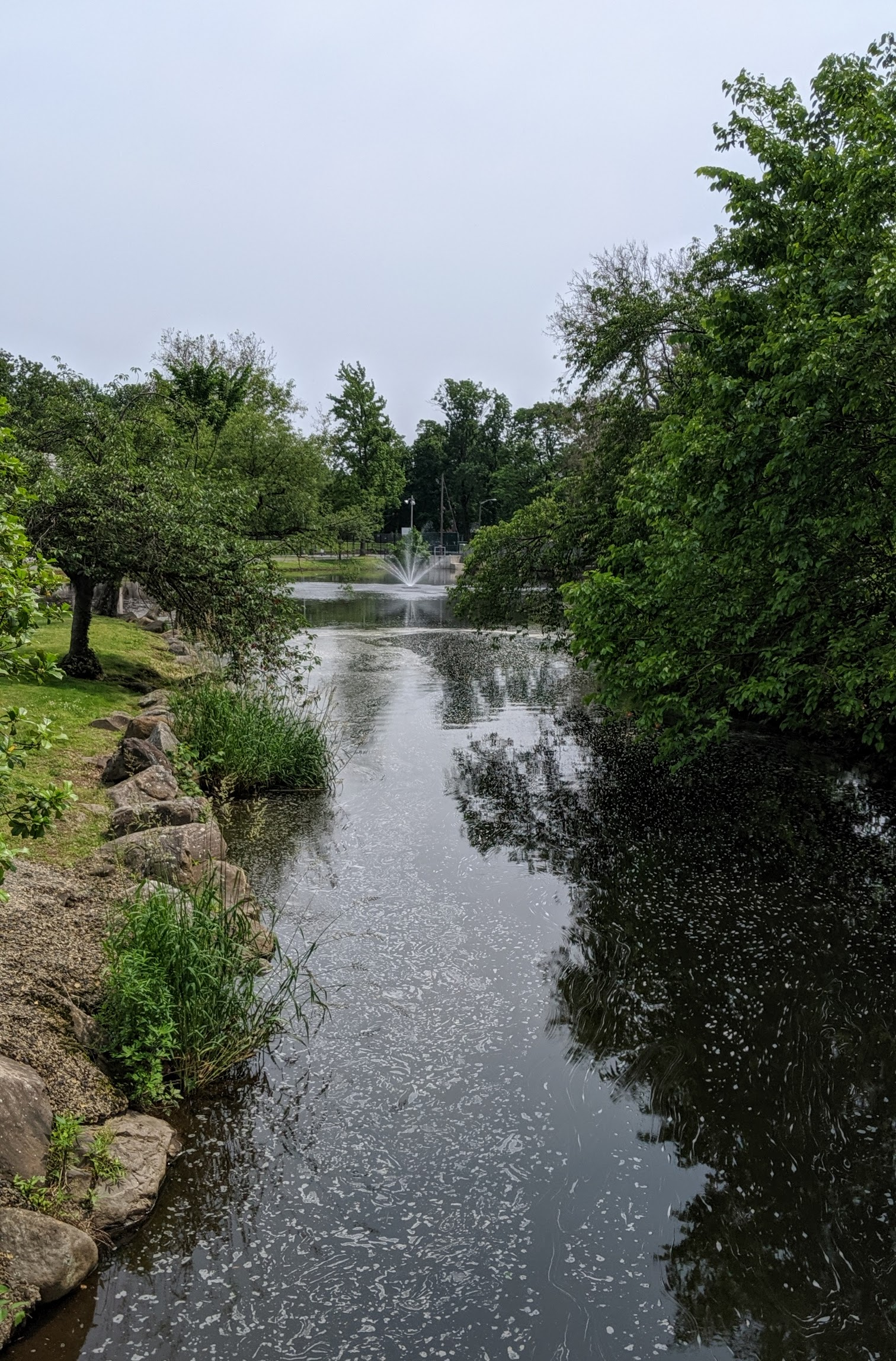
View of the Rahway River in Taylor Park, Millburn

South Mountain Reservation is home to Orange Reservoir and Campbell's Pond. A dramatic feature is Hemlock Falls: a 25-foot-high cascade of Rahway water over rock cliffs. The reservoir located in the reservation's northern tract. Within the borders of West Orange, it is owned by the City of Orange. It was originally developed during the intense urbanization of northeastern New Jersey in the late 19th century, drawing from the Rahway River. The man-made lake is no longer part of the water-supply system. It is now used for recreation. The complex abutting the reservoir includes a miniature golf course, and a restaurant, McLoone's, opened in 2011.

Just below South Mountain Reservation in Millburn, New Jersey, the river runs through Taylor Park.

=== Rahway River Parkway ===
The Rahway River Parkway is a greenway of parkland that hugs the Rahway River and its tributaries. Formed by the Union County Parks Commission in the 1920s, was designed by the Olmsted Brothers firm, who were the sons of the landscape architect Frederick Law Olmsted.

The "Friends of Rahway River Parkway," a nonprofit group, has been formed exclusively to encourage and advocate for the preservation, restoration and enhancement of the Rahway River Parkway, in accord with the Olmsted design principles inherent in its origins, and to promote appropriate public enjoyment of the Parkway.

  - Springfield, New Jersey. Briant Park.
  - Westfield/Mountainside. Echo Lake Park is situated on a lake formed on Nomahegan Brook, a tributary of the Rahway.
  - The Cranford, New Jersey section of the Rahway River Parkway follows the banks of the meandering river as it flows south through Lenape Park, Nomahegan Park, Hampton Park, MacConnell Park, the Cranford Canoe Club, Hanson Park, Sperry Park, Josiah Crane Park, Droeschers Mill Park, and Mohawk Park. The land for Sperry Park was donated by William Miller Sperry.
  - Clark/Winfield. Formerly Osceola Farm, owned by Thomas Sperry.
  - Rahway, New Jersey. Rahway River Park abuts a graveyard along the river here. Milton Lake Park is popular for fishing.

=== The Robinson's Branch Reservoir ===
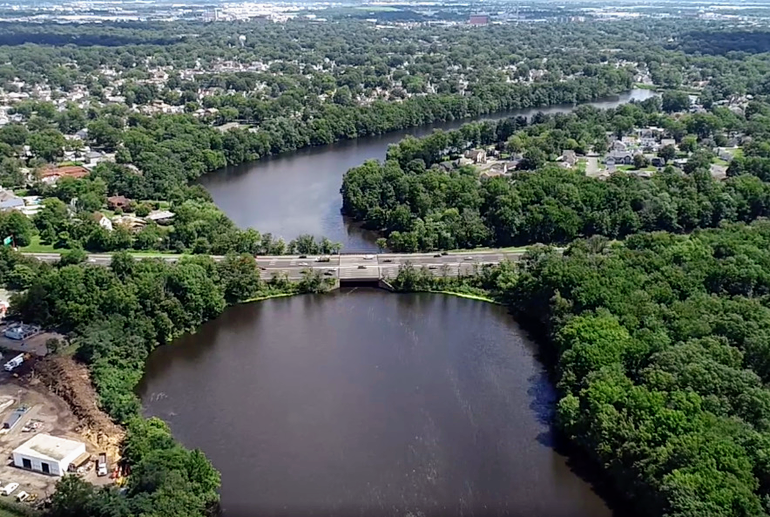
Robinson's Branch Reservoir in Clark, New Jersey. The Garden State Parkway bridge is seen crossing over the reservoir

The Robinson's Branch Reservoir, also known as the Clark Reservoir, is the largest body of water in Union County, and sits on that tributary in Clark.

=== Lower river ===
- Hawk Rise Sanctuary in Linden, New Jersey. is a 95-acre ecological preserve and wetland complex.
- Joseph Medwick Memorial Park in Carteret is named for baseball player Joe Medwick and offers scenic river vistas plus ball fields, tennis courts, playgrounds & picnic groves.

The salt marshes and mudflats along the lower Rahway are high priority habitats and are the most extensive in the watershed and span four communities: Carteret, Linden, Woodbridge Township and Rahway. Encompassing over 1,000 acres (400 ha), this priority habitat contains 434 acres of salt marsh and 238 acres of brush and shrub lands. Gulls, many species of shorebirds, breeding clapper rail, egrets, ducks, plovers, hawks, pheasants, wintering northern harrier and marsh wrens utilize the site.

== The Rahway River Watershed Association and RiverFest ==
The Rahway River Watershed Association is a non-profit organization dedicated to the protection and restoration of the river. RRWA works in cooperation with local river communities to provide opportunities for river education, curriculum support activities, community awareness of the river, and environmental stewardship of the watershed. The RRWA Watershed Learning Center (known as the Blue House) is located on the river at Lower Essex Street Park in Rahway.

The RRWA organizes an annual event in celebration of the river, RiverFest, featuring live music, art, food and other vendors, dance and environmental educational events.

== Recreation along the river ==
=== Canoeing and boating ===
The Cranford Canoe Club, built in 1908, rents canoes and kayaks for trips on the Rahway River in Cranford.

The Rahway Yacht Club, founded in 1904, is a private boating club docked on the river in Rahway, New Jersey.

Echo Lake, off Nomahegan Brook (a Rahway tributary) in Westfield and Orange Reservoir in South Mountain in Maplewood offer paddle boating.

=== Rahway River fishing ===
Fishing is popular along the Rahway. Many local fishing enthusiasts are among the biggest local champions of keeping the Rahway River and its parkland clean and vibrant for wildlife.

Fishermen who enjoy Rahway River fishing are encouraged to take home all fishing line to avoid injuring osprey and other large wildlife via entanglement which has caused deaths along the river.

On the third Monday of each month the Rahway River Trout Unlimited Chapter holds its monthly general meeting at the Cranford Community Center at 7:30pm to discuss Rahway River fishing. Fly fishermen may be seen casting lines in the Rahway along the dams in Cranford.

Brown trout, brook trout and rainbow trout 9 to 11 inches long are stocked for Rahway River fishing from late March to mid-May (only rainbow has been stocked since 2015). Along with these good-sized trout, much bigger breeders are also stocked to excite those anglers skilled or lucky enough to catch one (5-pound trophies are caught by these fishermen each spring).

Large numbers of sunfish and catfish are present in the Rahway River.

Smallmouth bass and largemouth bass, some quite large, are found when fishing the Rahway, as are channel catfish and bullhead catfish.

Striped bass and eels also surge up the river from Raritan Bay and encountered during Rahway River fishing. Large and very powerful carp appear as well.

Mark Modoski, angler and contributor for Field & Stream magazine, has written about fishing for catfish and carp on Nomahegan Lake off the river.

The Rahway River is home to four anadromous fish species (fish that spawn in freshwater and live in saltwater) and one species of catadromous fish species (fish that spawn in salt water and live in freshwater).

There are long-discussed plans to install a fish ladder at the Rahway City Water Works to aid these fish during their spawning migrations. Fish ladders are inundated structures with small underwater steps that allow fish to navigate around a dam and continue their migration. Other approaches include removing obstructions that are inoperative or no longer serve their purpose, or improving water quality and reducing debris that obstructs passage.

The fish targeted for upstream passage at the Rahway River Water Supply Dam are alewife (Alosa pseudoharengus), blueback herring (Alosa aestivalis), gizzard shad (Dorosoma cepedianum), white perch (Morone Americana) and the endangered American eel (Anguilla rostrate). Alewife and blueback herring are collectively referred to as river herring due to their similarity in appearance, range, and life histories. River herring, gizzard shad, and white perch are all anadromous (adults spawn in freshwater; juveniles migrate to saltwater); whereas American eel are catadromous (adults spawn in the ocean; the young migrate to freshwater habitats).

Historically, anadromous spawning runs of alewife, blueback herring, striped bass, and American shad and catadromous runs of American eel were common in the NYC/NJ harbor estuary. However, poor stream conditions and an increased number of obstacles to upstream migration, like tide gates, culverts, and dams, have reduced these species’ migration opportunities. Restoring fish passage on major tributaries like the Rahway can be accomplished through the construction of fish ladders.

=== Birding on the river ===
Birdwatching is a frequent activity along the Rahway. The Friends of Lenape Park often birdwatch along the banks of its streams such as Nomahegan Brook.

=== Other activities on the Rahway ===
Cranford's Riverside Inn and the River and Rail Cantina sit aside the river with outdoor seating near parkland. McLoone's Boathouse is located on Orange Reservoir in South Mountain Reservation. The famous Paper Mill Playhouse sits aside the river.

The Hanson Park Conservancy hosts an annual "rubber ducky race" in the river, over the Hansel Dam falls next to Sperry Park, as a fundraiser for the park.

The Great Pumpkin Sail is held in Echo Lake on All Saints' Day. At this annual event, on the day after Halloween, families bring their Halloween Jack-O-Lanterns, light them, and set them afloat on Echo Lake Park's lower lake. The glowing firelit faces reflect in the water as families enjoy free hot chocolate, marshmallows, and entertainment around the campfire.

== Historic uses of the Rahway River ==
Beginning in the 1880s, the Cranford River Improvement Association and other Cranford organizations held various water carnivals and regattas on the river. According to an 1886 New York Times article, the carnival's decorations illuminated the night: "nearly a hundred boats will be gaily decorated with sky lanterns, the river banks will be illuminated with colored lights, the bridges will be lit up, there will be bands of music and a display of fireworks." Novelist Robert Ferro described these carnivals in his 1983 novel The Family of Max Desir, centered on a fictionalized version of the river.

The Rahway was once host to a variety of sawmills and gristmills. Droeschers Mill is the last remaining mill on the Rahway.

The Paper Mill Playhouse is an acclaimed theater in the area for live theatrical performances. In March 1795, Sam Campbell built The Thistle Paper Mill on land along the Rahway River in the town of Millville, later renamed Millburn. Campbell ran his business for about 20 years until he was forced to close down due to a fire. The building remained vacant for several years and ownership changed several times. In the late 1870s, Diamond Mill Paper Company took over the property and used it for their paper making business until 1928.

The Rahway River was also the site of freshwater pearl-fishing as a form of recreation as depicted in photographs from the early 1910s.

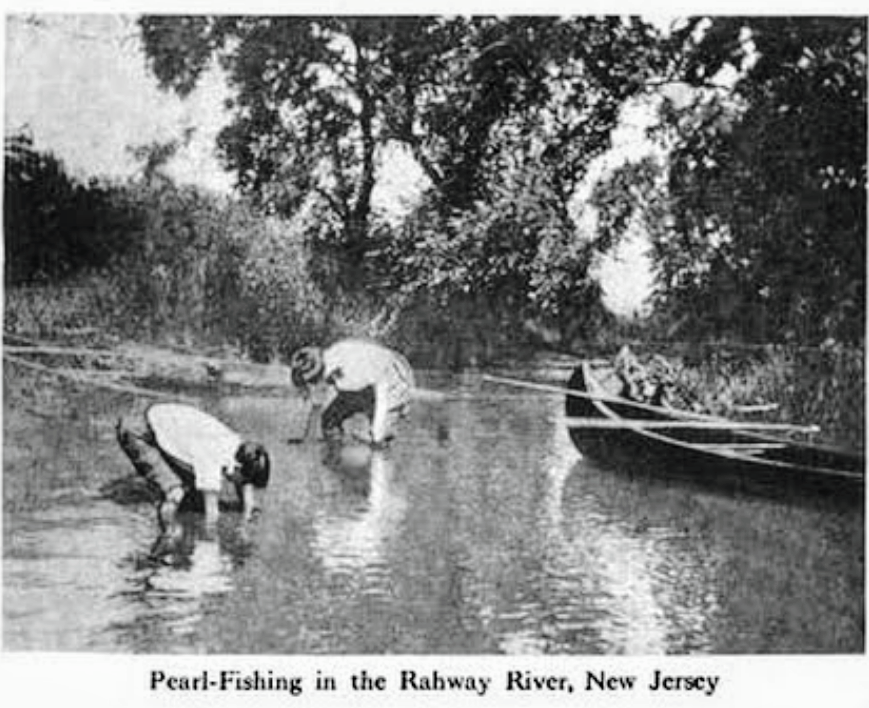
Freshwater pearl-fishing on the Rahway River

== Art on the Rahway ==
The American painter Hugh Bolton Jones (1848–1927) depicts the Rahway River in his 1880s work "Spring," part of the collection at the Metropolitan Museum of Art.

Several landscape artists of the 19th century also painted the Rahway River's woodland scenes en plein air, including Frank Townsend Lent and Bruce Crane, who painted in Cranford, and the aforementioned Hugh Bolton Jones.

== Flooding, environmental rehab and flood control ==
The highly urbanized Rahway River watershed in New Jersey suffers from frequent flooding due to extensive development and destruction of riparian wetlands and floodplains.

Floods have caused damage to houses, businesses, municipal facilities and public infrastructure. Portions of the Rahway River Basin have also suffered environmental degradation and opportunities exist for restoration.

The most damaging floods of record within the Rahway River Basin resulted from the storms of July 1938, May 1968, August 1971, August 1973, July 1975, June 1992, October 1996, July 1997, Tropical Storm Floyd in September 1999, April 2007 Nor’easter, and Hurricane Irene in August 2011. During the April 2007 storm, 70 to 100 homes suffered major damage to first floor and foundations. Union County and the Township of Cranford were declared federal disaster areas as a result of the April 2007 storm. As a result of Hurricane Irene, residents and business owners along the Rahway River have suffered extensive financial losses and personal hardship than in most severe prior storms.

Organizations fighting for flood control and protection of the Rahway River watershed include:

- The Mayors Council on Rahway River Watershed Flood Control. After Hurricane Irene in 2011, mayors of towns along the Rahway River established this organization to find solutions to flooding in the Watershed.
- The Cranford Flood Advisory Committee (CFAC) was formed as an official committee of the Township and has been active on current issues since mid 1997.
- The Cranford Environmental Commission ("My Green Cranford") is a statutory board of seven regular Cranford-resident members and two alternates Cranford resident-members.
- Rahway River Watershed Association. The purpose of the Rahway River Association is to protect and restore the Rahway River and its ecosystem.
- Rahway River Watershed Storm Water Advisory Board. With continued concerns about flooding, a regional board was formed in early 2013 to advise Rahway River Watershed towns and advocate for changes to ordinances and implementation of best storm water management practices that can protect water quality and reduce the quantity of uncontrolled runoff.
- 1000 Rain Gardens. This initiative aims to develop, through public and private means, at least 1000 rain gardens in the Rahway River Watershed from West Orange in Essex County to Woodbridge in Middlesex County.
- The New Jersey Watershed Ambassadors Program is a community-oriented AmeriCorps environmental program coordinated by the New Jersey Department of Environmental Protection and is designed to raise awareness about watersheds in New Jersey. Through this program, AmeriCorps members are placed in watershed management areas across the state to serve the educational water-related interests of their local communities. The program invited all ages of citizens to improve the quality of New Jersey's waterways and water quality.

Watershed Ambassadors monitor the rivers of New Jersey through volunteer monitoring programs. The AmeriCorps leaders are used to train community volunteers to use these two monitoring techniques in order to assess the health of waterways within their communities. Watershed Ambassadors make presentations to schools and community organizations along the Rahway River and other rivers for free. These interactive presentations explore water quality and watershed related topics in New Jersey.

In September 2016, the United States House of Representatives authorized the Rahway River Basin Flood Risk Management Feasibility Study under the Water Resources Development Act. The study is now a full-go after Congressman Leonard Lance and the Mayors Council on Rahway River Watershed Flood Control pushed for years for its completion.

Its goal is to devise a plan to protect New Jersey communities from Rahway River flooding.

“The Rahway River Basin Flood Risk Management Feasibility Study will create a lasting solution for the protection of New Jersey municipalities that include Cranford, Kenilworth, Maplewood, Millburn, Rahway, Springfield and Union and the surrounding areas from severe flooding,” said Lance. “For years these municipalities have pursued this project."

Local politicians, including Ann Dooley, have urged Senator Cory Booker to work on Rahway River flooding relief as well.

The U.S. Army Corps of Engineers is partnering with the New Jersey Department of Environmental Protection to carry out the Feasibility Study to identify various flood risk management alternatives for communities along the Rahway River Basin, with a specific emphasis on the city of Rahway and the township of Cranford.

The alternatives are currently undergoing economic analysis, comparing the amount of risk management provided to each alternative’s associated costs. In order for a flood risk management alternative to be considered by the Federal Government, it must provide a positive benefit-to-cost ratio. This economic analysis phase is important to not only determine the benefit-to-cost ratio of each alternative, but it is also critical for the justification and request for authorization from Congress to construct a project after the Feasibility Study is complete.

Descriptions of the flood risk management alternatives that the U.S. Army Corps of Engineers are analyzing are available.

Early in August 2016, Congressman Leonard Lance joined U.S. Sen. Bob Menendez (NJ) and Colonel David A. Caldwell, Commander of U.S. Army Corps of Engineers (New York District), for a site visit of a proposed flooding solution, known as Alternative 4A.

That plan proposed modified the Orange Reservoir on the Rahway River in South Mountain Reservation through Cranford, as well as numerous properties in the City of Rahway.

== Rahway River cleanups ==
Volunteers organize Rahway River clean-ups all year round. They remove discarded fishing lines, invasive weeds and discarded litter and compete to see who can remove the most debris. Depending on the weather, river cleaners are encouraged to dress warmly and wear boots. Gloves, litter grabbers and refreshments may occasionally be provided at these cleanups.

“The residents do a great job cleaning the parks,” Union County Watershed Ambassador Ismail Sukkar told LocalSource.

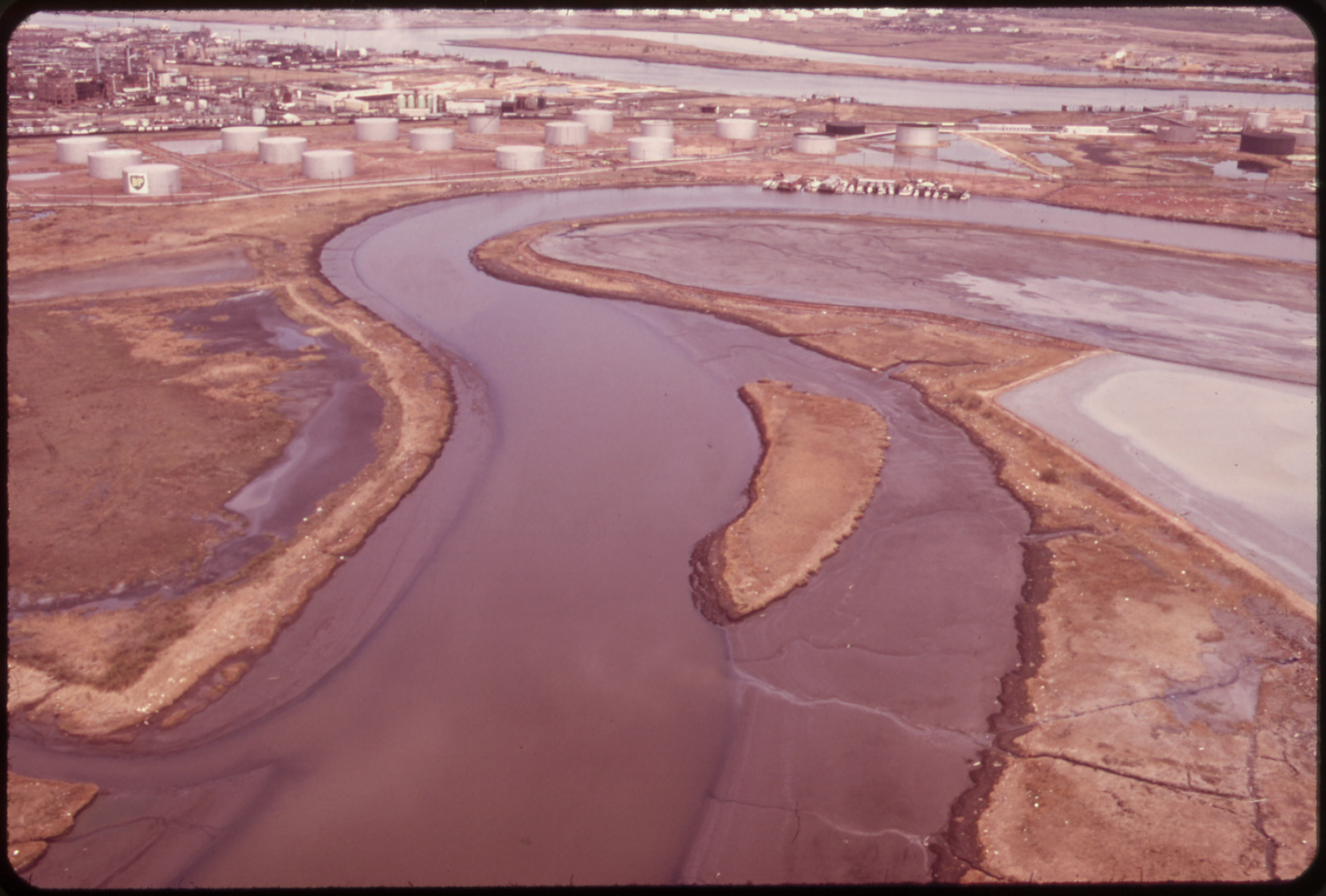
1973 photo of the Rahway River looking towards the Arthur Kill. Potters Island is in the center. The site of the 2016 Rahway Arch project curves into the Rahway in the upper right of the photo, directly above Potters Island. Marshes Creek enters the Rahway on the lower left, and the site of the 2016 Tremley Point Road project is to the left of Potters Island in the photo

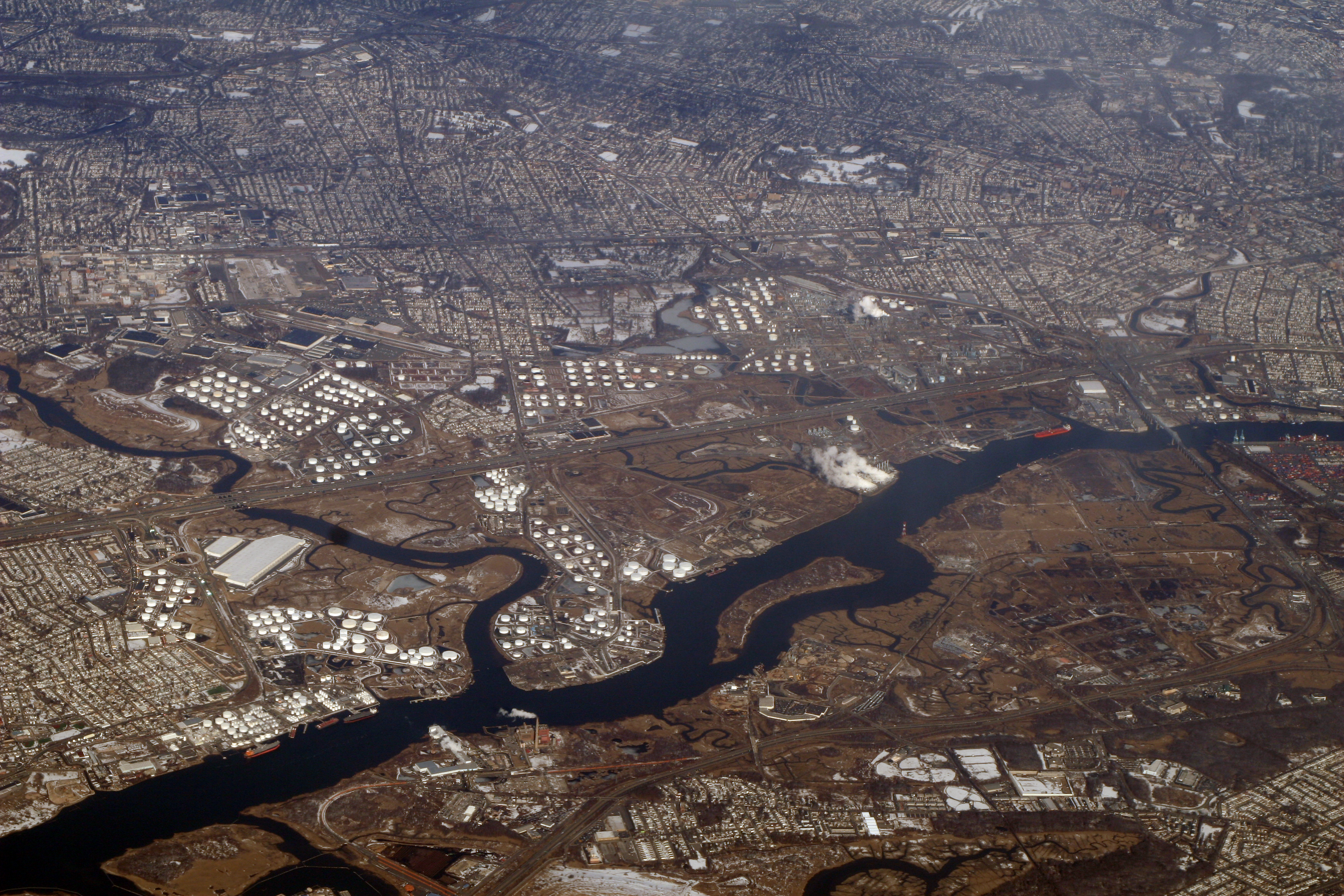
Photo of the Arthur Kill. Staten Island is on the bottom of the photo. The Rahway snakes into the kill from the center middle on the left of the photo

=== Dirty soil dumping controversy ===
Recently, environmental groups have expressed concern over two projects on the lower tidal banks of the Rahway, roughly at Potters Island:

- Soil Safe–Metro12, also known as the Rahway Arch, in Carteret. This project is alleged to involve the dumping of contaminated soil.
- 4050 Tremley Point Road This involves a concern by environmentalists raised in late 2016 over the dumping of contaminated soil on a wedge of riverside land where Marshes Creek meets the Rahway River (not to be confused with Morses Creek which flows into the Arthur Kill to the north). The 88-acre site on the river in a flood zone had lain untouched for almost 60 years; it had been used for coal ash disposal for a decade at that time, and environmental groups complained that the trucked-in soil was far more heavily contaminated than the site itself. The site had been purchased in 2013 to build a warehouse, trucking depot, driveway and parking lot.

== Legends of buried treasure ==
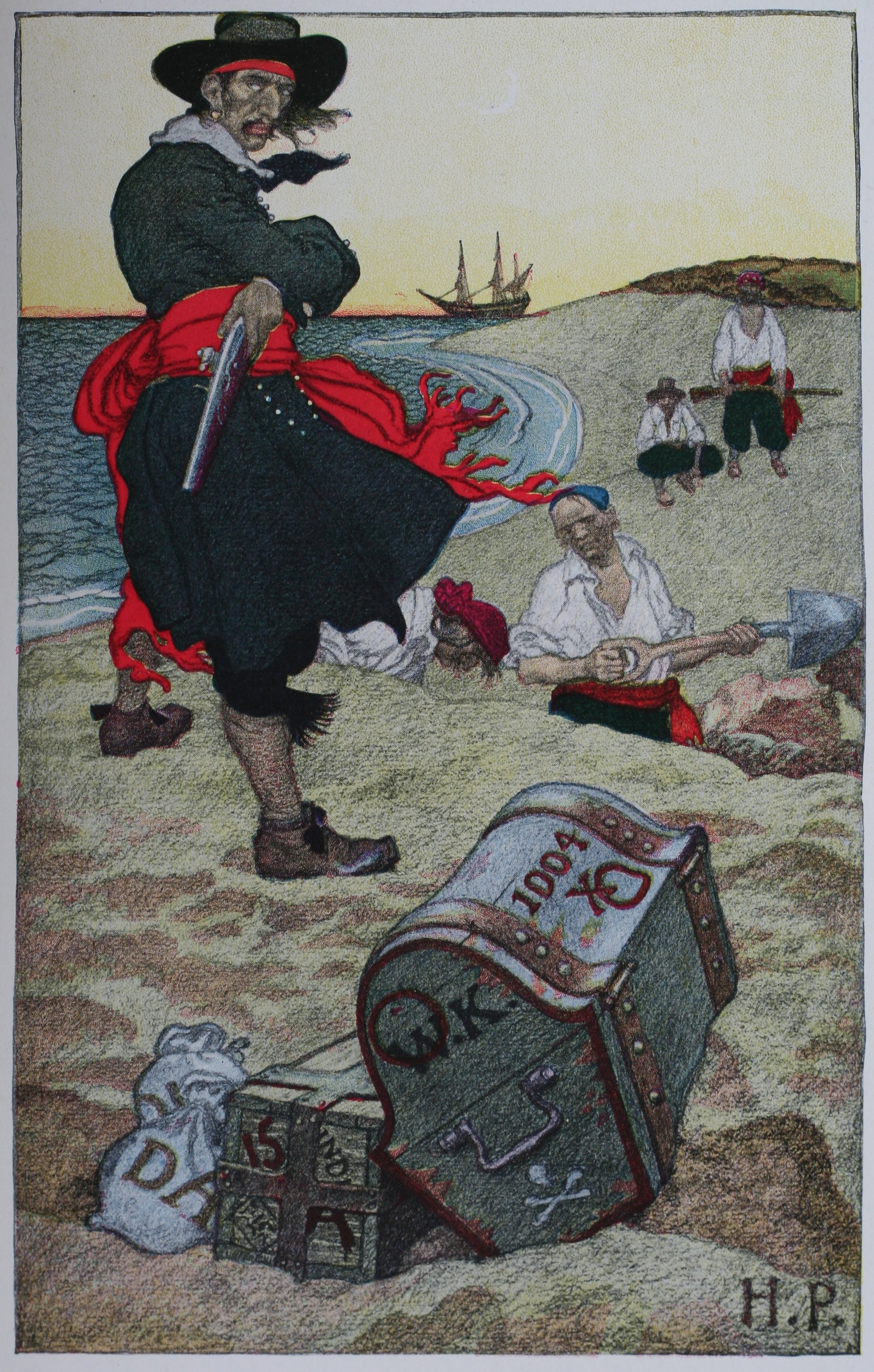
Howard Pyle's fanciful painting of Kidd burying treasure

According to recently resurfaced 19th century lore, pirate Captain William Kidd buried treasure on the banks of the Rahway River, alongside the body of one of his men he had just murdered. The location was said to on the southern banks of the river at a spot called Price's or Post's Woods, said to be midway between Rahway and the Arthur Kill. The murder and burial of treasure was witnessed secretly from a tree, allegedly, by a Lenape chieftain known as Ra-wa-rah who is the namesake of the city of Rahway, as Ra-wa-rah returned from a fishing journey.

== See also ==
- List of crossings of the Rahway River
- Rahway River Bridge
- List of rivers of New Jersey
- Union County, New Jersey#Parks
- Geography of New York–New Jersey Harbor Estuary
