= List of crossings of the Rahway River =

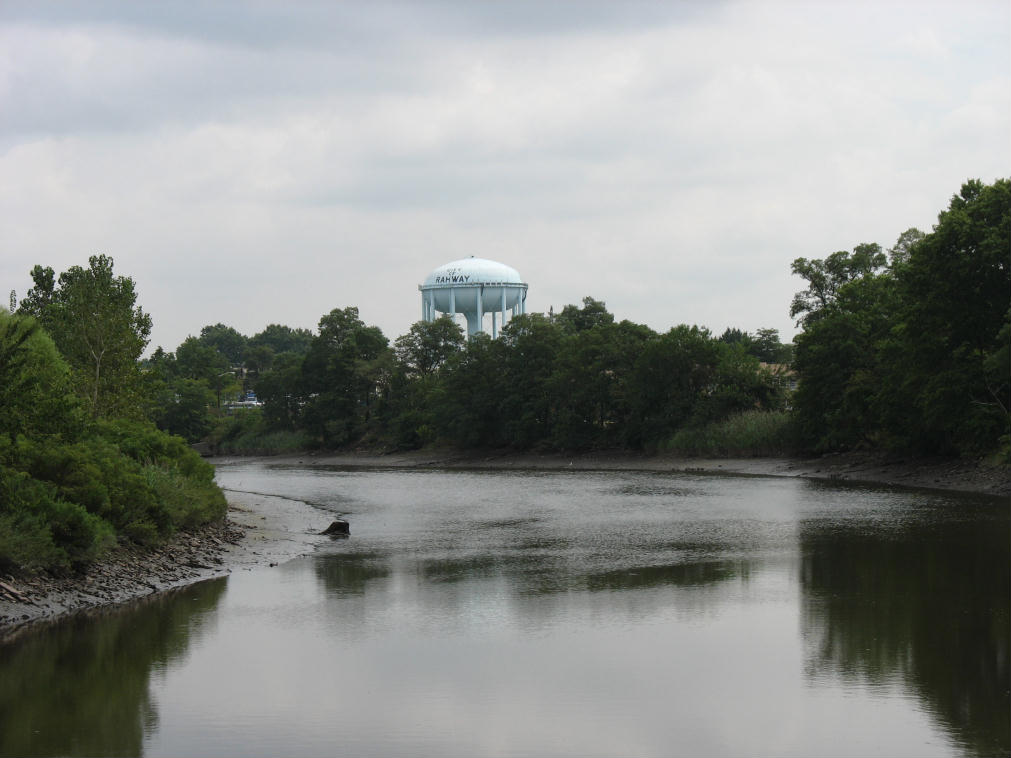
Rahway River in Rahway

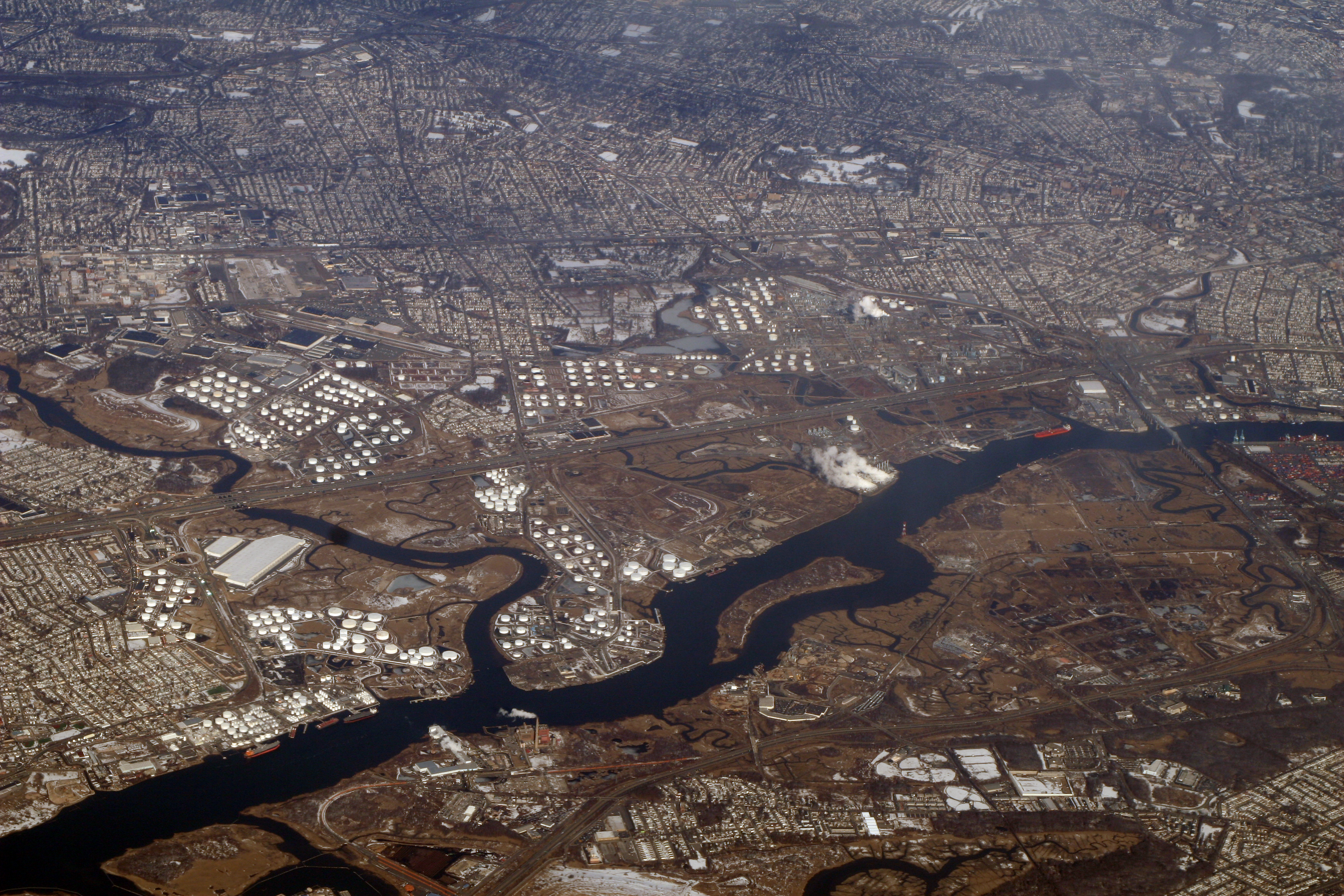
New Jersey Turnpike over Rahway River near mouth at Arthurs Kill

The Rahway River drainage basin encompasses approximately 41 square miles in Union, Essex, and Middlesex counties in the northeastern part of the U.S. state of New Jersey.

The Rahway River consists of four separate branches that converge in Rahway, from whence it flows as a single waterway to its mouth at the Arthur Kill. The longest, or West Branch, courses for 24 miles from Verona. The East Branch rises in West Orange/Montclair and joins the West Branch in Springfield, forming the main stem of the river. The South Branch, which originates in Woodbridge, and the Robinson's Branch, which begins in Scotch Plains, join the main stem in Rahway. The upper portion above Rahway consists of floodplains, woodlands and freshwater marshes; the lower portion includes saltwater marshes and tidal flats. The river is tidal for approximately five mies upstream.

Many of the crossings of the river were built in the late 19th and early 20th century and are part of the Rahway River Parkway, a greenway along the banks of the river.

== Crossings (main stem) ==
Crossing	Image	Carries	Location	Coordinates	References
Conrail (CRCX)		Garden State Secondary	Linden/Carteret	40°35′56″N 74°13′51″W	
New Jersey Turnpike		Interstate 95	Linden/Carteret	40°35′56″N 74°13′54″W	
Lawrence Street		CR 514	Rahway	40°35′57″N 74°16′07″W	
U.S. Route 1/9			Rahway	40°35′58″N 74°16′12″W	
South Branch enters from south
Milton Avenue		CR 648	Rahway	40°36′16″N 74°16′18″W	
Monroe Street			Rahway	40°36′29″N 74°16′23″W	
Bridge Street			Rahway	40°36′32″N 74°16′25″W	
Rahway River Bridge		Northeast Corridor (MP 19.13); Amtrak (Northeast Regional); New Jersey Transit; Northeast Corridor Line; North Jersey Coast Line	Rahway	40°36′33″N 74°16′26″W	
Elizabeth Avenue			Rahway	40°36′36″N 74°16′29″W	
Robinson's Branch enters from west
Grand Avenue		CR 613	Rahway	40°36′43″N 74°16′27″W	
Whitter Street			Rahway	40°36′57″N 74°16′31″W	
Church Street			Rahway	40°37′05″N 74°16′42″W	
St. George's Avenue		New Jersey Route 27	Rahway	40°37′09″N 74°16′57″W	
Rahway River Water Supply Dam			Rahway	40°37′08″N 74°17′22″W	
Valley Road		CR 608	Clark	40°37′39″N 74°17′07″W	
Jacksons Pond Dam aka Valley Road Dam			Clark	40°37′41″N 74°17′07″W	
Bloodgoods Pond Dam			Clark	40°37′43″N 74°17′53″W	
Garden State Parkway		(MP 137.08)	Cranford/Clark	40°38′23″N 74°17′26″W	
Raritan Road		CR 607	Cranford/Clark	40°38′24″N 74°17′26″W	
Dam			Cranford/Clark	40°38′25″N 74°17′26″W	
Rahway River Parkway Footbridge			Cranford	40°38′26″N 74°17′38″W	
Rahway River Parkway Footbridge aka Crane Parkway River Crossing			Cranford	40°38′25″N 74°18′10″W	
Conrail; Lehigh Line			Cranford	40°38′31″N 74°18′15″W	
Rahway River Parkway Footbridge			Cranford	40°38′44″N 74°18′04″W	
High Street		aka Lincoln Avenue	Cranford	40°39′01″N 74°18′06″W	
Droeschers Mill Dam			Cranford	40°39′02″N 74°18′05″W	
South Avenue East		CR 610	Cranford	40°39′18″N 74°18′03″W	
Raritan Valley Line		New Jersey Transit	Cranford	40°39′21″N 74°18′02″W	
North Avenue East		New Jersey Route 28	Cranford	40°39′24″N 74°18′03″W	
Union Avenue			Cranford	40°39′31″N 74°18′06″W	
Hansel's Dam			Cranford	40°39′32″N 74°18′09″W	
Springfield Avenue		CR 615	Cranford	40°39′36″N 74°18′22″W	
Eastman Street (2x)			Cranford	40°39′27″N 74°18′31″W; 40°39′30″N 74°18′36″W	
Springfield Avenue		CR 615	Cranford	40°39′41″N 74°18′30″W	
Balmiere Parkway Footbridge			Cranford	40°39′55″N 74°18′36″W	
Boulevard aka Kenilworth Boulevard		New Jersey CR 509	Cranford/Kenilworth	40°40′24″N 74°18′47″W	
Lenape Park Dam			Cranford/Kenilworth	40°40′26″N 74°18′48″W	
U.S. Route 22 dual bridges		(MP 52.09)	Union/Springfield	40°41′16″N 74°18′43″W; 40°41′19″N 74°18′43″W	
Dam	Dam on the Rahway		Union	40°41′27″N 74°18′32″W	
Milltown Road			Union/Springfield	40°41′37″N 74°18′24″W	
Rahway Valley Railroad			Union/Springfield	40°42′06″N 74°18′36″W	
Morris Avenue		New Jersey Route 82	Union/Springfield	40°42′29″N 74°18′07″W	
Springfield Avenue		New Jersey Route 124	Union/Springfield	40°42′44″N 74°17′58″W	
West Branch and East Branch converge
Phillipsburg-Newark Expressway		Interstate 78	Hobart Gap; Springfield/Millburn	40°42′50″N 74°17′59″W	

== Crossings West Branch ==
Crossing	Image	Carries	Location	Coordinates	References
Ridgewood Road			Millburn	40°43′14″N 74°18′24″W	
Taylor Pond Dam			Millburn	40°43′18″N 74°18′22″W	
Footbridge			Millburn	40°43′22″N 74°18′23″W	
Millburn Avenue		CR 527	Millburn	40°43′26″N 74°18′25″W	
Essex Street			Millburn	40°43′30″N 74°18′23″W	
Morristown Line		New Jersey Transit	Millburn	40°43′33″N 74°18′27″W	
Footbridge			Millburn	40°43′34″N 74°18′27″W	
Glen Avenue			Millburn	40°43′44″N 74°18′28″W	
Diamond Mill Pond Dam			South Mountain Reservation; Millburn	40°43′52″N 74°18′25″W	
Campbells Pond Dam			South Mountain Reservation; Millburn	40°44′11″N 74°18′18″W	
Dam			South Mountain Reservation; Millburn	40°44′29″N 74°18′07″W	
Overlook Trail Footbridge			South Mountain Reservation; Millburn	40°44′39″N 74°18′01″W	
Rahway Trail Footbridge			South Mountain Reservation; Millburn	40°44′49″N 74°17′47″W	
South Orange Avenue		CR 510	South Mountain Reservation; Millburn	40°45′14″N 74°17′33″W	
Lenape Trail Footbridge			South Mountain Reservation; Millburn	40°45′20″N 74°17′32″W	
Tulip Spring Bridge		Cherry Lane	South Mountain Reservation; Millburn	40°45′24″N 74°17′30″W	
Orange Reservoir Dam			South Mountain Reservation; West Orange	40°45′33″N 74°17′15″W	
Footbridge			South Mountain Reservation; West Orange	40°46′08″N 74°17′00″W	
Northfield Avenue		CR 508	West Orange	40°46′10″N 74°17′00″W	
Mount Pleasant Avenue		New Jersey Route 10	West Orange	40°47′34″N 74°16′09″W	
Essex Freeway		Interstate 280	West Orange	40°47′52″N 74°15′54″W	

== See also ==
- List of crossings of the Elizabeth River
- List of county routes in Union County, New Jersey
- List of county routes in Essex County, New Jersey
- List of county routes in Middlesex County, New Jersey
- List of bridges documented by the Historic American Engineering Record in New Jersey
- List of crossings of the Raritan River
