= Bayonne Bridge =

Bridge between New Jersey and New York

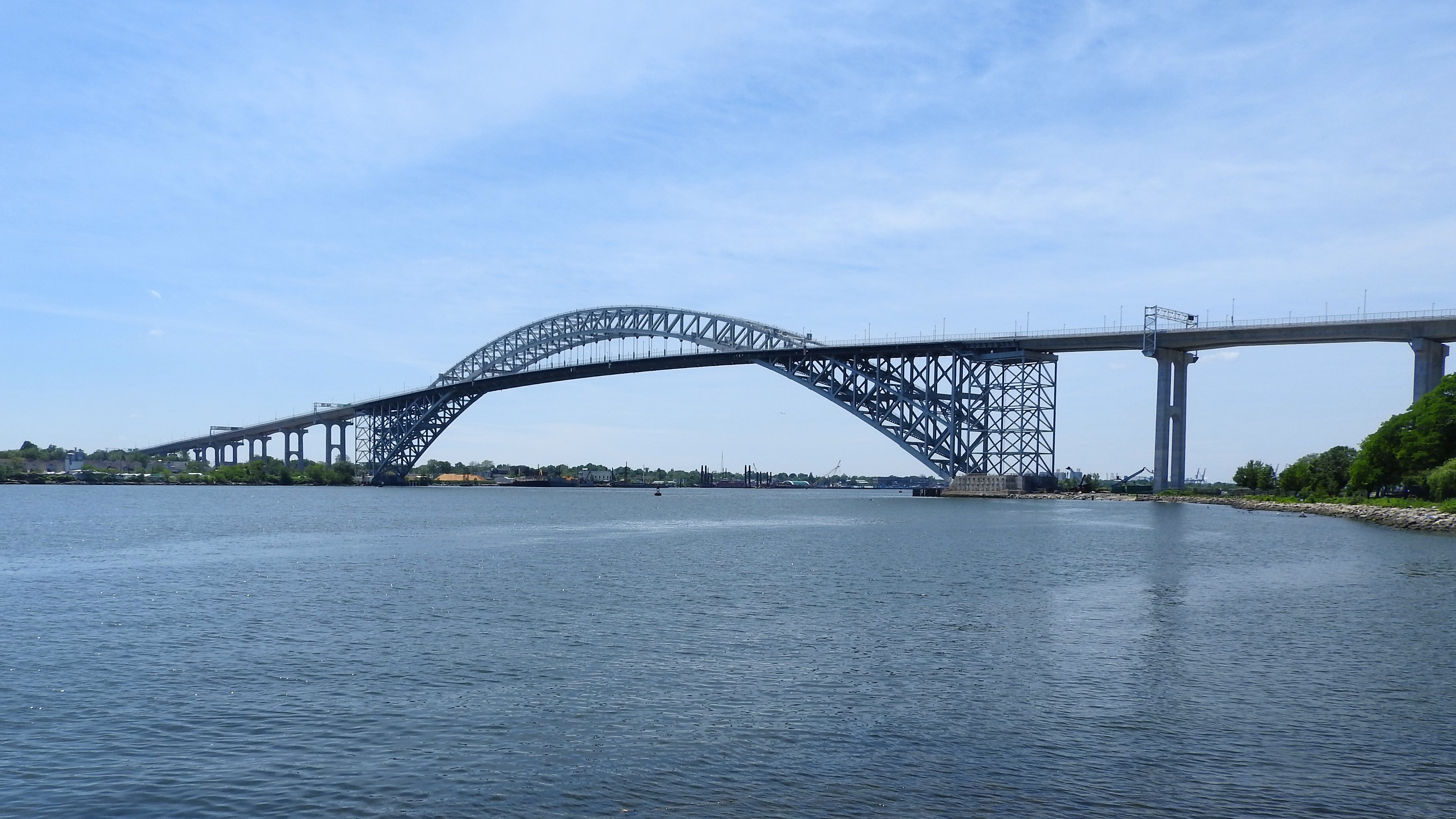
- View from Bayonne towards Staten Island, May 2019
- Coordinates: 40°38′31″N 74°08′32″W
- Carries: 4 lanes of NY 440 (NY side) / Route 440 / CR 501 (NJ side)
- Crosses: Kill Van Kull
- Locale: Staten Island, New York, and Bayonne, New Jersey, U.S.
- Maintained by: Port Authority of New York and New Jersey

Characteristics
- Design: Steel through arch bridge
- Total length: 5,780 feet (1,762 m)
- Width: 85 feet (26 m)
- Longest span: 1,675 feet (510.54 m)
- Clearance above: 14 feet (for motor vehicles)
- Clearance below: 215 feet (66 m) (for ships)

History
- Opened: November 15, 1931 (94 years ago)
- Rebuilt: 2013–2019

Statistics
- Daily traffic: 9,025 (2016)
- Toll: For cars, southbound only, as of July 12, 2026: Tolls by Mail: $23.30; E-ZPass Mid-Tier: $19.55; E-ZPass Peak: $16.79 (Weekdays: 6‍–‍10 am & 4‍–‍8 pm; Weekends: 11 am‍–‍9 pm); E-ZPass Off-peak: $14.79; Registered commuter: $6.88

Location
- Interactive map of Bayonne Bridge

The Bayonne Bridge is a steel through arch bridge that spans the Kill Van Kull between Staten Island, New York, and Bayonne, New Jersey, United States. It carries New York State Route 440 and New Jersey Route 440, with the two roads connecting at the state border at the river’s center. It has the eighth-longest steel arch mainspan in the world, the longest in the world at the time of its completion. The bridge is also one of four connecting New Jersey with Staten Island; the other two roadway bridges are the Goethals Bridge in Elizabeth and Outerbridge Crossing (which also carries Route 440) in Perth Amboy, and the rail-only span is the Arthur Kill Vertical Lift Bridge, all of which cross the Arthur Kill.

The original four-lane roadway was designed for the Port Authority of New York and New Jersey by Swiss master bridge-builder Othmar Ammann and architect Cass Gilbert. Completed in 1931, it included a walkway, and offered 151 feet (46 m) of vertical clearance above the water.

A Port Authority project to provide increased clearance required to accommodate New Panamax ships began in 2013, raising it approximately 64 feet (20 m) to 215 feet (66 m) by June 8, 2017. The new roadways opened on May 24, 2019, with each carrying two lanes of unidirectional motor traffic plus shoulders for disabled vehicles, in addition to a separate path for pedestrians and bicyclists.

== Design ==
Bayonne Bridge was designed by Swiss master bridge-builder Othmar Ammann and architect Cass Gilbert. It spans the Kill Van Kull between Port Richmond in Staten Island, New York, and Bayonne in Hudson County, New Jersey. The bridge was constructed parallel to the street networks of both Bayonne and Port Richmond, Staten Island; the resulting 58-degree angle to the Kill Van Kull required a longer span than if the bridge had been built perpendicular to the strait. The total length of the bridge is 5,780 feet (1,760 m).

=== Roadbed ===
As built, the Bayonne Bridge contained a roadbed 1,675 feet (511 m) long without intermediary piers. The main span was connected to viaducts at either end. The Port Richmond viaduct was 2,010 feet (610 m) long and the Bayonne viaduct was 3,010 feet (920 m) long, supported by piers that ranged from 20 to 110 feet (6.1 to 33.5 m) tall. The bridge originally featured a mid-span clearance above the water of 151 feet (46 m), adequate for the United States Navy's tallest ships at the time. The roadway was 85 feet (26 m) wide.

Between 2013 and 2019, the bridge's clearance was raised approximately 64 feet (20 m), from 151 to 215 feet (46 to 66 m). A new roadway was constructed above the existing roadway within the current arch structure. This new clearance was to accommodate Post-Panamax ships.

=== Arch ===
The Bayonne Bridge's steel parabolic arch is made up of 40 linear segments. Its lower chord rises 266 feet (81 m) above the Kill Van Kull, while the upper is 325 feet (99 m) above the waterway. The arch is influenced by the Hell Gate Bridge in New York City, designed by Ammann's mentor Gustav Lindenthal. Gilbert had specified an ornamental granite sheathing over the steelwork as part of the original proposal, but as in the case of the George Washington Bridge, the stone was eliminated in order to lower the cost of the bridge during the Great Depression. It was the first bridge to employ manganese steel for the main arch ribs and rivets.

When completed in 1931, the Bayonne Bridge was the longest through arch bridge in the world. It surpassed the Sydney Harbour Bridge, its more massive-buttressed "sister bridge" in Australia, by 25 feet (7.6 m) and took the distinction from the Hell Gate Bridge. The Bayonne Bridge has a lightweight design, weighing only 16,000 short tons (15,000 t), compared to the Sydney Harbour Bridge's 37,000 short tons (34,000 t). The Bayonne Bridge is also half as wide and 2,010 feet (610 m) longer overall than its sister bridge.

== History ==
=== Early history and construction ===
==== Conceptualization and background ====
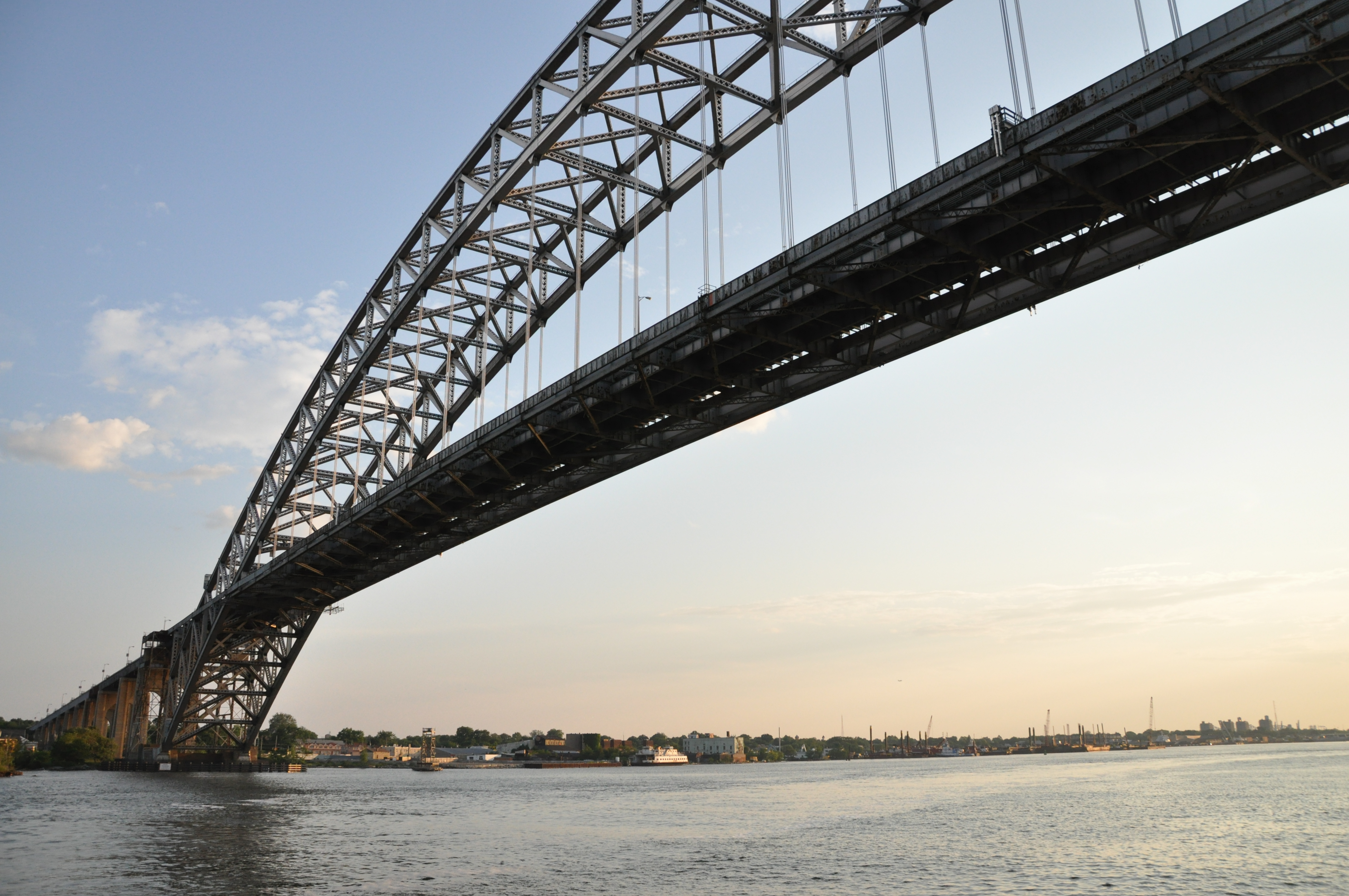
The original deck of the Bayonne Bridge

In 1921, the Port of New York Authority (now the Port Authority of New York and New Jersey) was created to oversee transportation in the Port of New York and New Jersey. At the time, bridges in New York City were being built at a brisk pace. The Port Authority opened its first two bridges between New Jersey and Staten Island in 1928: the Goethals Bridge and the Outerbridge Crossing. A third crossing was being planned between Port Richmond and Bayonne. All three bridges were built to complement the traffic from a future fourth bridge or a tunnel from Staten Island to Brooklyn. Initially, the third crossing was proposed to be a tunnel. However, the Port Authority ultimately decided to construct a bridge, to be designed by Ammann and Gilbert. Ammann, who was chief architect of the Port Authority, chose the steel arch design after rejecting a cantilever and suspension design as expensive and impractical for the site, given a requirement by the Port Authority that the bridge must be able to accommodate the future addition of rapid transit tracks.

==== Construction ====
Construction on the bridge began in 1928. At the time, it was supposed to be open in early 1932 and was supposed to cost $16 million (equivalent to $300,000,000 in 2025), but it ended up costing only $13 million to build (equivalent to $244,000,000 in 2025). The bridge had to be built without blocking shipping traffic on the Kill Van Kull. To do this, engineers used hydraulic jacks to support the two sides of the arch while the two pieces, consisting of prefabricated truss segments that were made up of high-strength alloy steel, were being built toward a point in a middle. Afterward, prefabricated pieces of the roadway's support structure were hung from cables connected to the arch.

=== Opening and 20th century ===
==== 1930s to 1960s ====
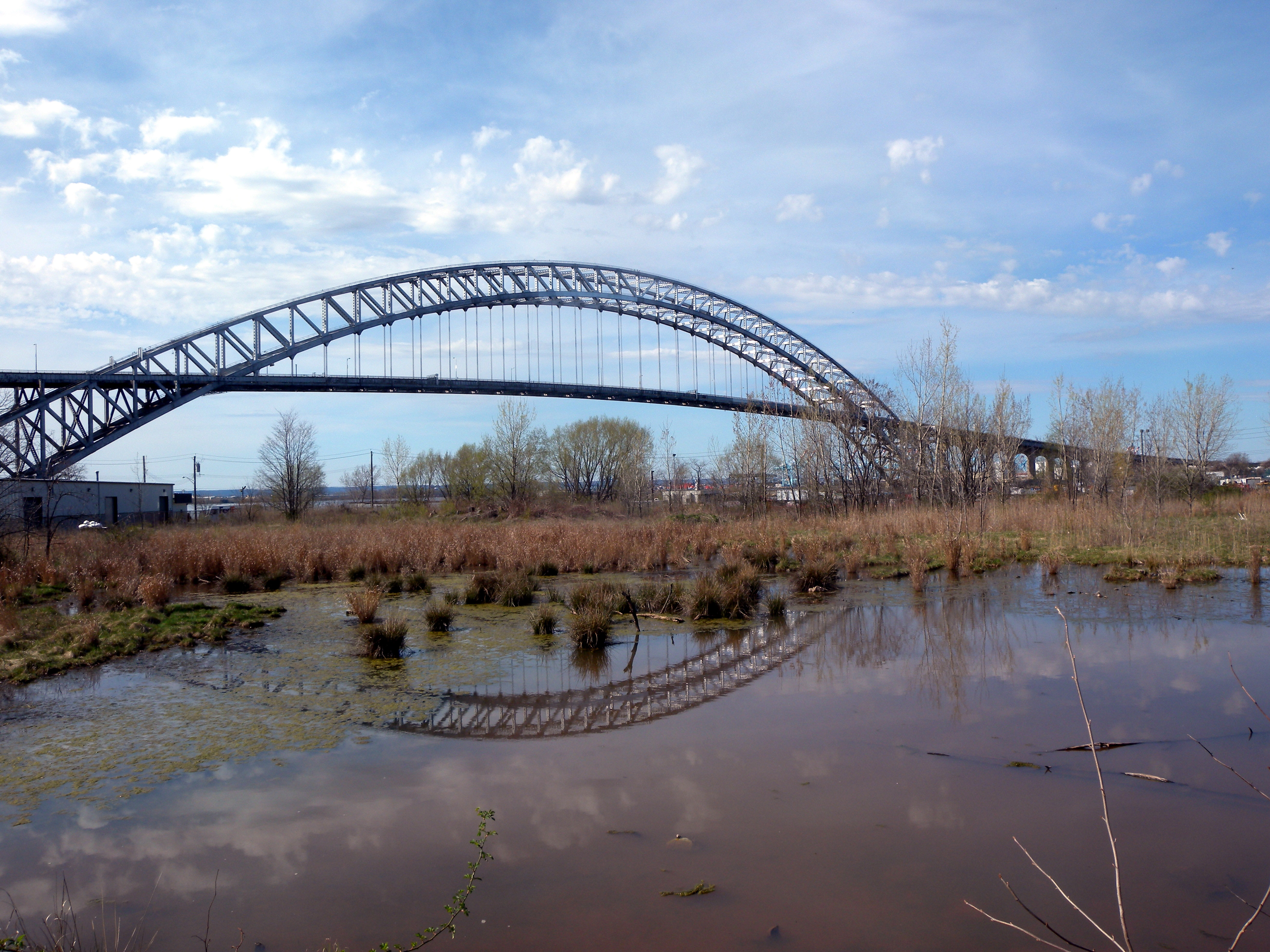
The bridge with its original deck, seen from the North Shore Branch embankment at Nicholas Avenue

The Bayonne Bridge opened on November 15, 1931, after dedication ceremonies were held the previous day. On opening day, about 7,000 pedestrians and 17,000 vehicles crossed the bridge. The new crossing was expected to reduce Staten Islanders' average commutes by 18 to 20 minutes, reducing the need to use the Goethals Bridge or Outerbridge Crossing. The Bayonne Bridge's dedication ceremony was attended by David M. Dow, the Secretary for Australia in the United States, and the same pair of golden shears used to cut the ribbon was sent to Australia for the ribbon-cutting of the Sydney Harbour Bridge four months later. After the ceremony in Sydney, the scissor blades were separated and one was sent back to the Port Authority. Time referred to the symmetric detail of the bridge as "impressive and haunting", while the commune of Bayonne in France sent a congratulatory telegram. The American Institute for Steel Construction selected the Bayonne Bridge as the "Most Beautiful Steel Bridge" in 1931, choosing it over the George Washington Bridge. The bridge was designed with space for railroad tracks, but these were never built.

Pedestrians were originally required to pay a toll. This practice was eliminated in 1940, at which point the operator booths for collecting it were demolished. The Bergen Point Ferry, which paralleled the bridge, stayed in service until 1961.

During World War II the space under the Bayonne Bridge's Staten Island approach was utilized by Archer Daniels Midland as a storage site for uranium used in the Manhattan Project. About 1,207 short tons (1,078 long tons; 1,095 t) of the material destined for nuclear weapons developed was stored in 2,007 barrels between 1939 and 1942. Due to the long half-life and high radioactivity of unrefined uranium ore, the site became highly polluted and was later designated a federal Superfund site. Cleanup by the U.S. Army Corps of Engineers was scheduled for completion by the end of 2023.

The tollbooth was re-landscaped in a beautification project conducted in 1951 by the Port Authority and the City of Bayonne. In 1956, some land under the New Jersey approach viaduct was set aside to create the Juliette Street Playground. A new toll plaza in Staten Island was created in 1964. Additionally, the bridge deck was widened. In 1966, the Staten Island toll plaza was altered significantly, replacing the original toll booths with six modern toll booths along with and widening the viaduct near the toll plaza. The project also made electrical modifications and installed new lighting.

==== 1970s to 1990s ====
The toll plaza stopped collecting tolls from New Jersey-bound drivers in 1970, with three of the toll booths being demolished. From this point on, tolls would only be collected from vehicles entering Staten Island and leaving Bayonne. To save energy during the 1973 oil crisis, the decorative lighting across the arch span was shut off temporarily that year. The bridge became a National Historic Civil Engineering Landmark in 1985.

On October 2, 1990, heavy truck traffic was temporarily banned after a crane being towed by a tugboat struck the center span. The bridge reopened two days later, with traffic reduced to one lane to allow the bridge to undergo emergency repairs. On October 12, 1991, the bridge was closed for inspection and repair after a container ship's loading boom damaged five of the arches' stringer beams.

In 1995, a CCTV security system with 24/7 cameras were installed along the walkway to monitor and prevent self harm. Additionally, new lighting was installed on the plazas and approaches, and improvements were made to the Morningstar Road off-ramp under a separate contract. The bridge began accepting E-ZPass in June 1997, making it the first PANYNJ bridge to start accepting the system. In 1999, the bridge was extensively rehabilitated. The roadway pavement was removed, the concrete deck, expansion joints and scuppers of both approaches were replaced, the concrete deck, joints and scuppers of the central span were repaired and a latex modified concrete pavement was laid on the roadway. The superstructure steel members and concrete piers of the entire bridge were also repaired. Later that same year, permanent maintenance and construction platforms were built beneath the roadway and the approaches to allow for easier inspection.

=== 21st century ===
In 2001, various improvements were made to the CCTV system, and new navigational lights and aviation lights were installed. Additionally, most of the street lamps were replaced, and the structurally deficient New Jersey abutment was extensively rehabilitated.

==== Late 2000s and early 2010s: Plans for roadbed raising ====
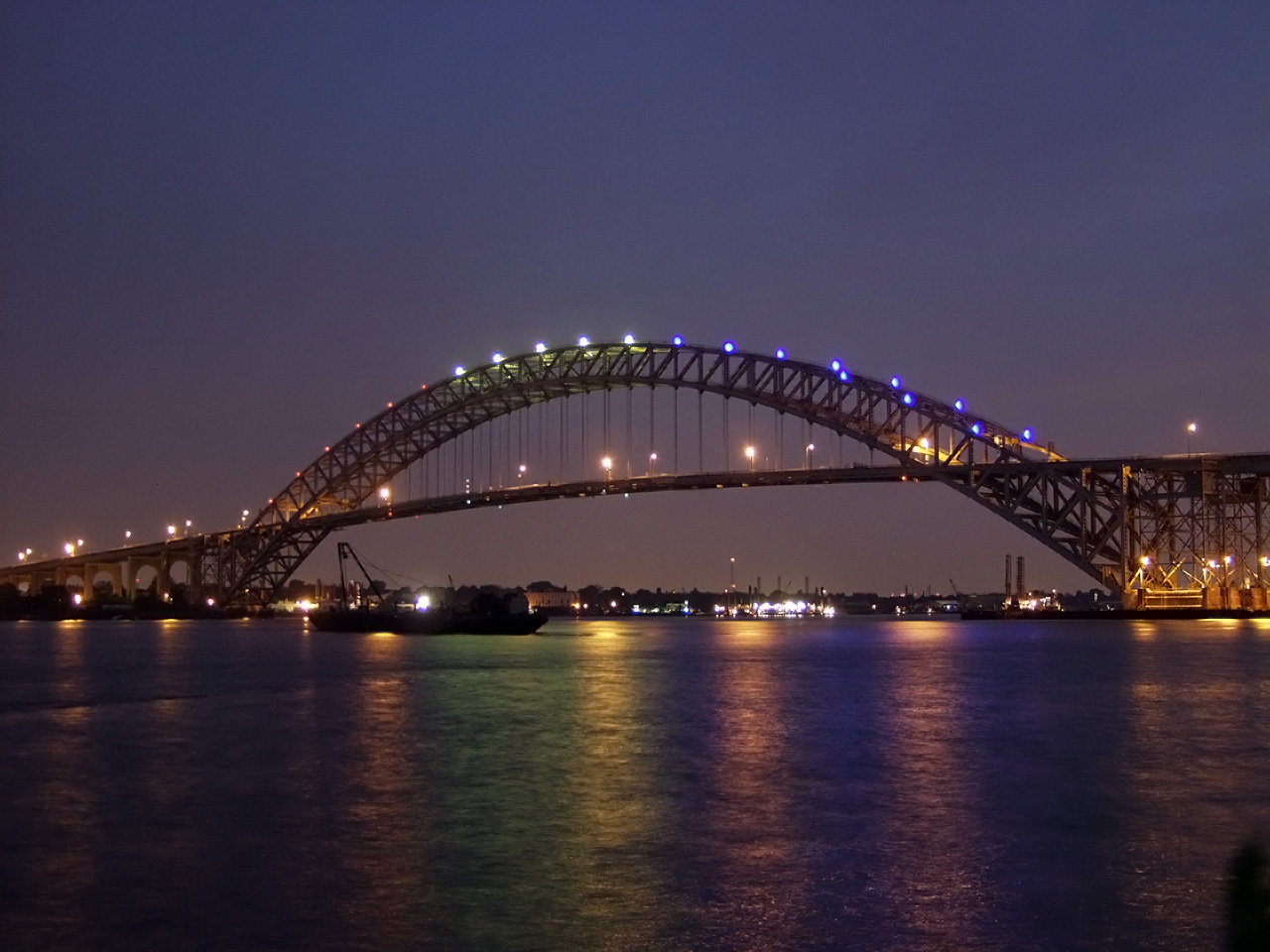
The bridge seen with its original deck at sunset

In the late 2000s, the Port Authority began to plan a project to allow larger container ships to use the Kill Van Kull. The expansion of the Panama Canal was announced to allow new contemporary ships coming from Asia to reach the East Coast, but the bridge was too low for these larger ships to pass under it on the way to and from Newark Bay. Its clearance of between 151 to 156 feet (46–48 m) above the Kill Van Kull depending on the tide already meant that some contemporary ships, which could reach 175 feet (53 m) above the waterline, had to fold down antenna masts, take on ballast, or wait for low tide to pass through. New, larger New Panamax ships made things worse. If the problem were not fixed, the Port of New York and New Jersey could have lost significant shipping business to other ports such as Charleston, South Carolina. In August 2009, the Port Authority started a planning analysis to determine how to fix the air draft problem. Final construction in the raise the road project was completed in May 2019 with the opening of the new higher pedestrian and bicycle path. Additionally, the New Jersey abutment was structurally deficient, and the bridge was functionally obsolete.

The Port Authority commissioned the U.S. Army Corps of Engineers (CoE) to conduct a study of the question, which was completed in 2009, and authorized up to $10 million for planning and engineering services to develop options to deal with the bridge's low clearance. The CoE study looked at three options for the bridge, besides the no-build option. The quickest option they identified, and the one ultimately chosen, was a $1.7 billion project to raise the bridge's roadway to increase its height by 40 percent, which could be accomplished by 2019 at the earliest. It would need a clearance of 215 feet (66 m) to handle the new ships. Another option presented was to build a new cable-stayed bridge, which would have cost $2.15 billion and taken until 2022. The most expensive option would be to get rid of the bridge altogether and replace it with either a bored tunnel or an immersed tunnel through which traffic would traverse under the Kill Van Kull. This option would have taken the longest, being complete in 2024 and costing $2.2 to $3 billion. In initial planning documents, a vertical-lift bridge was also considered, but this was not investigated further in the CoE study.

Another study, an environmental review by the U.S. Coast Guard, was commissioned in 2009. The review was required because the project would take place over a navigable waterway. The study cost over $2 million, took four years, and resulted in 5,000 pages of reviews. Despite its duration and cost, which precluded the start of construction until 2013, it was one of the Coast Guard's quickest environmental reviews for such a major project. In March 2012, the Port Authority submitted a request to the federal government for an expedited environmental review process, which was approved in July 2012 even though some residents in Newark and Staten Island said they wanted the Coast Guard to conduct a full environmental review.

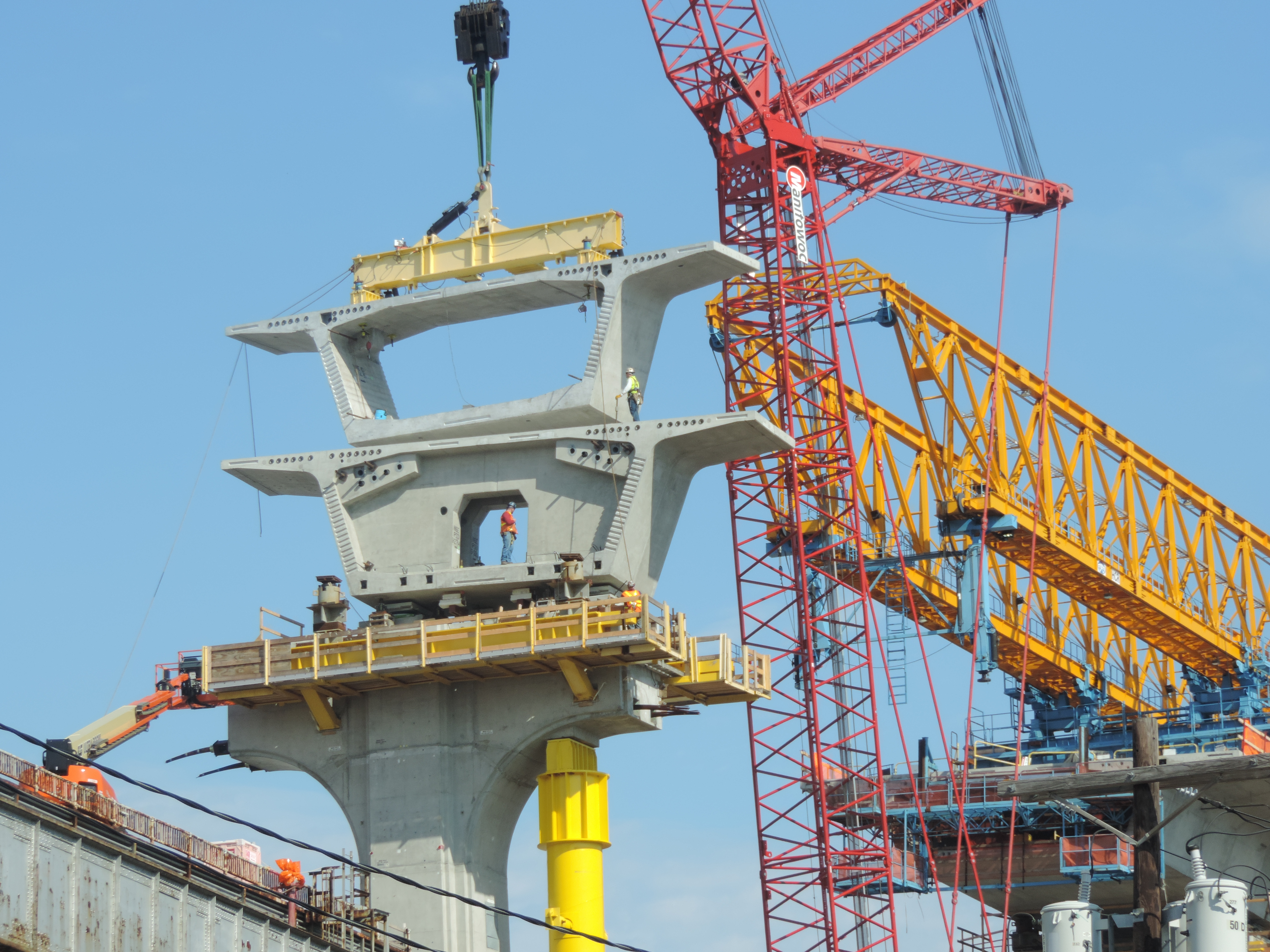
New section in Bayonne

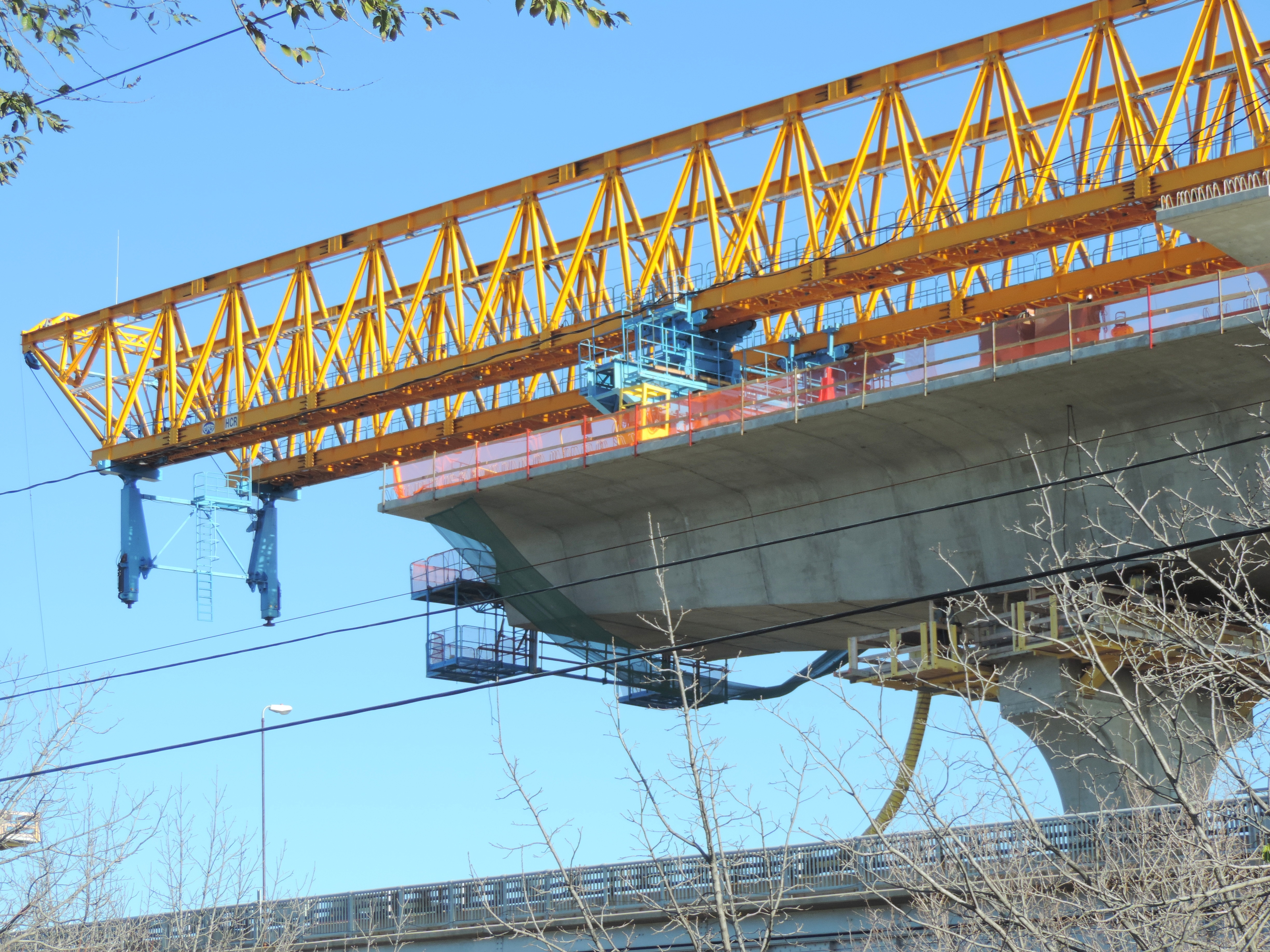
New section in Port Richmond

According to the Port Authority, the "Raise the Roadway" project would have many benefits, the first being that it would allow larger, more environmentally friendly ships to pass through the port. As a result of the project, the proportion of the arc above the roadway would be reduced, with only 22 cables suspending the new roadway below the arch as opposed to 30 cables holding up the old roadway. As for the roadway itself, the single roadway would be replaced by two new roadway decks with new supporting piers and approach roads. Route 440 would be widened from one 40-foot (12 m) roadway with no shoulders and four 10-foot (3.0 m) lanes, to two 30-foot-9-inch (9.37 m) roadways with two 12-foot (3.7 m) lanes each, a median divider, and 4-foot-9-inch (1.45 m) shoulders. There would also be a bikeway and walkway the entire length of the bridge, with access ramps to replace stairs. The design also allows for future transit service such as light rail. Extending the Hudson-Bergen Light Rail line to Staten Island over the bridge has been proposed, though final design plans do not include a rapid transit component. Finally, the project would support nearly 2,800 jobs and $240–380 million in wages throughout the construction industry, as well as $1.6 billion of economic activity.

The CoE estimated that raising the Bayonne Bridge would produce a $3.3 billion national benefit, noting that 12% of all US international containers pass under the bridge, that the port indirectly creates 269,900 jobs, and that port activity generates $11 billion in annual national wages. The project would allow 12,000-container ships to pass under the bridge, increasing capacity; before the project, the largest ships allowed to pass under the bridge were 9,000-container ships. Congressmen from both New York and New Jersey pressed the Port Authority to act quickly, despite lowered revenues from reduced traffic at the Port Authority's six crossings. The Port Authority announced its official plan in 2011. The Coast Guard held two public meetings about the bridge in 2012. Improvements at Port Jersey on the Upper New York Bay were also underway.

==== Mid-2010s: Construction of new roadbed ====
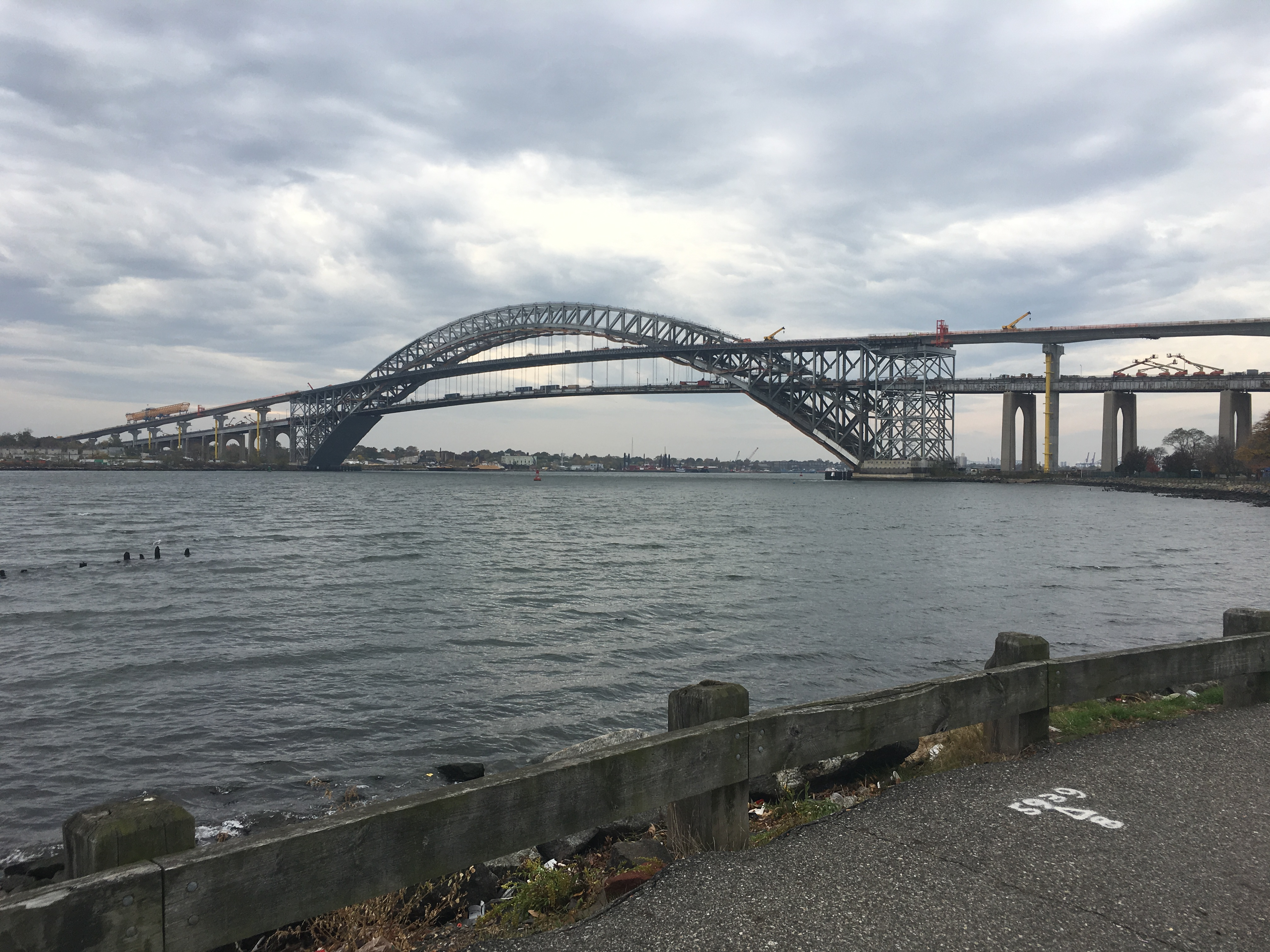
Late 2016 state, with both the old deck and new deck

The Port Authority believed that it was possible to build the new roadway without interrupting traffic flow between Staten Island and Bayonne. In July 2012, the Port Authority announced construction would begin in the middle of 2013, to be completed by 2017. In this timeline, removal of the existing roadway would be completed by late 2015, in time for the opening of the widened Panama Canal. The project would cost $1.7 billion and last five years.

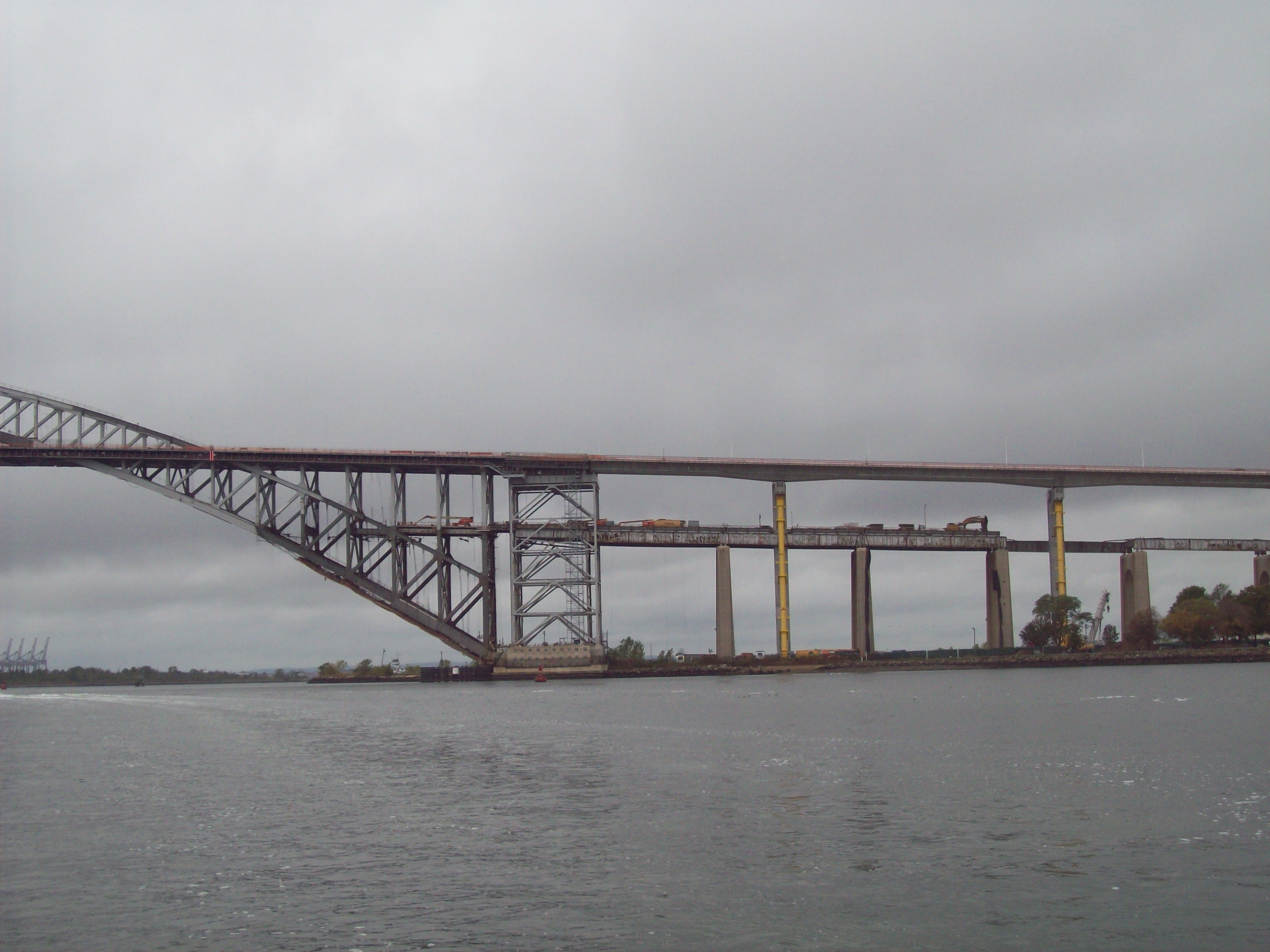
In October 2017, old deck partially removed

One of the challenges faced by the project was the tight confines of the construction area: residential homes lay less than 20 ft (6.1 m) from the work site, though none of them were in the path of the construction itself. In 2014, Staten Islanders living near the Port Richmond work site filed a lawsuit, alleging that the construction work violated the Civil Rights Act of 1964 by exposing predominately-minority communities in Port Richmond to toxins. In 2015, some Bayonne residents lodged complaints due to excessive noise, vibrations, dust over their neighborhood, and construction debris falling off the bridge (such as paint chips), though the Port Authority later settled those complaints. The project would also necessitate the temporary closure of a park in Bayonne. Additionally, the Bayonne Bridge would remain open to vehicle traffic throughout the construction.

On April 24, 2013, the Port Authority's Board of Commissioners awarded a $743.3 million contract to a joint venture of Skanska Koch and Kiewit Infrastructure Company. The construction involved building support columns first, then adding prefabricated road segments using a gantry crane that rolled on top of the arch. The gantry crane would construct one rope-supported section of the new roadway at a time, using a temporary beam to support the existing roadway while each rope was replaced. The existing roadway would then be removed. Temporary bridge closures allowed new floor beams to be attached to the arch's ropes in order to support steel stringers that would hold up the new roadway. This work was expedited by Barack Obama's presidential administration due to the importance of the project to national commerce, being one of the first applicants to Obama's "We Can't Wait" initiative of important infrastructure projects. New Jersey Governor Chris Christie also considered the project a high priority for his state.

The pedestrian walkway, cantilevered from the western side of the roadway, was temporarily closed on August 5, 2013, for reconstruction. It was to be moved to the eastern side of the bridge. The walkway was scheduled to reopen in 2017. In 2015, the completion date was delayed to 2019, due to unfavorable weather conditions in the winter of 2014–2015. This also delayed the desired navigational clearance to late 2017. The delays in the project meant that, with the expansion of the Panama Canal being completed in mid-2016, larger ships would not be able to serve Newark, thus possibly negatively affecting traffic to other ports on the United States' East Coast. The Port Authority revised its timeline, expecting traffic to be shifted to the new roadway in early 2017, the old roadway to be removed by late 2017, and the project to be completed in mid-2019 with the completion of the roadway for southbound traffic. In November 2016, the future northbound span, intended temporarily for both directions of travel, was completed.

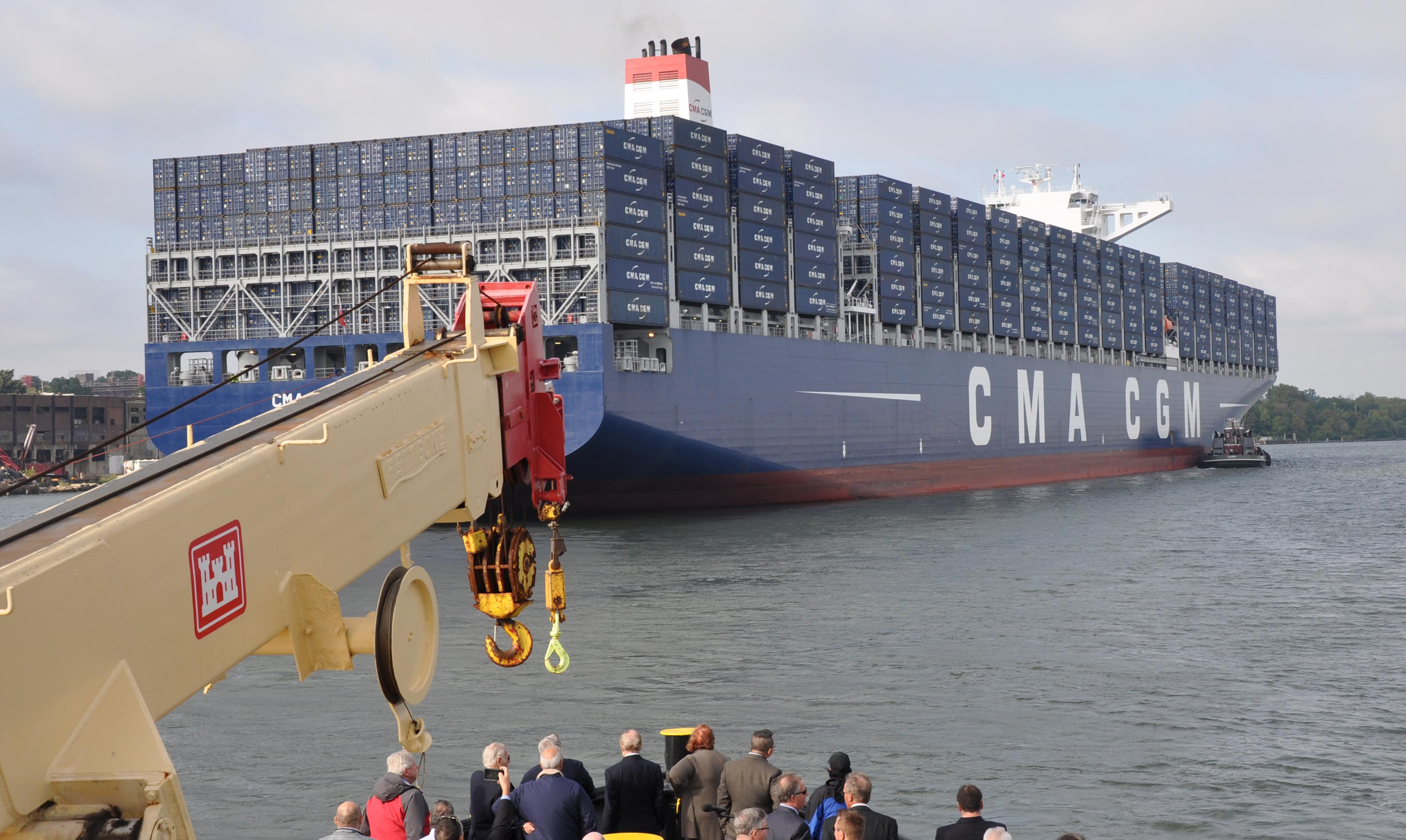
A New-Panamax ship, the CMA CGM Theodore Roosevelt, about to transit under the heightened Bayonne Bridge in September 2017

On February 20, 2017, the completed eastern (future northbound) roadway opened for traffic, with one lane in each direction, and the old lower roadway was permanently closed. The western (future southbound) roadway was scheduled to be completed in 2019, at which time there would be two lanes in each direction and a pedestrian walkway. Also on February 20, the Bayonne Bridge became the first Port Authority crossing to use a fully automated and cashless electronic toll collection system. All vehicles proceed without stopping at the toll plaza. Those with E-ZPass are billed in the usual way, while cameras record the license plate numbers of those without an E-ZPass tag and their registered owners soon receive a toll bill by mail. The desired navigational clearance was achieved June 8, 2017. Two years after the opening of the northbound roadway, on February 11, 2019, the new southbound roadway was completed, and the traffic flow of the bridge was restored to two lanes in each direction. The pedestrian and bike path opened May 24, 2019. The overall project received the 2020 Outstanding Civil Engineering Achievement award from the American Society of Civil Engineers, citing the "first-of-its-kind construction sequence, ... keeping both road and sea traffic open."

==== 2020s to present ====
Suicide prevention call boxes were installed on the pedestrian walkway in March 2023. After they were implemented on the George Washington Bridge in December 2023, the 11 K1 call boxes on the pedestrian path were upgraded to utilize the Knightscope Emergency Management System (KEMS) in March 2024. A study is being commenced to potentially upgrade existing suicide equipment, as well as adding equipment to the northbound roadway. Upgrades include adding netting to the fences of the pedestrian path, and upgrading call boxes to have increased communication capabilities with the Port Authority Police.

== Traffic ==
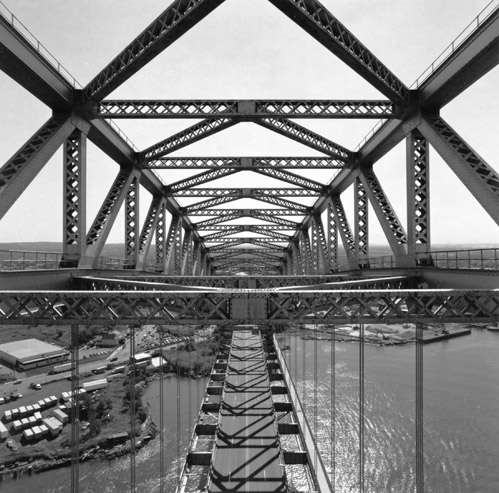
View of the bridge's original deck from the lower chord

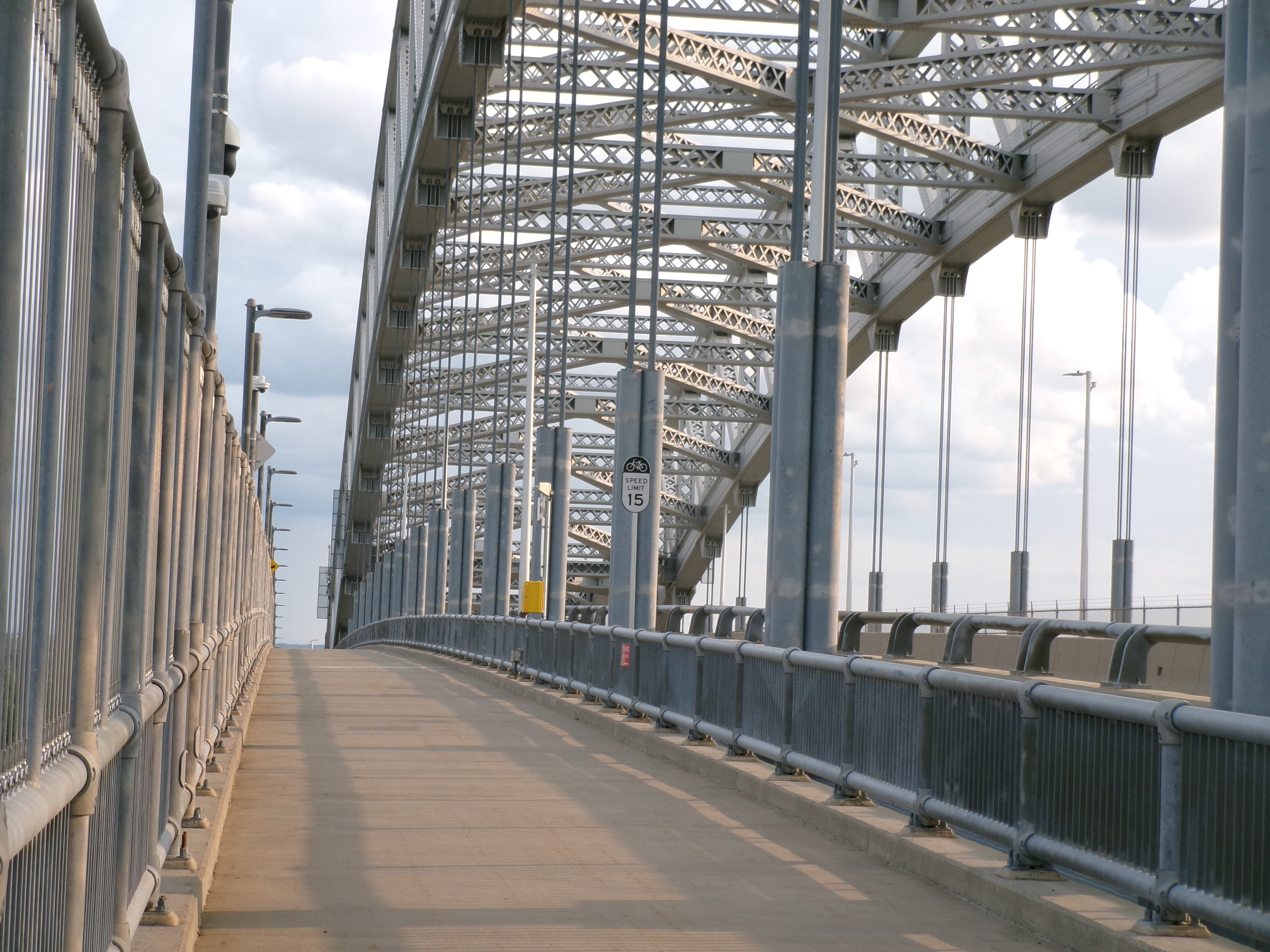
Pedestrian walkway of the reconstructed Bayonne Bridge with the bicycle speed limit sign, July 2026

From January to November 2016, the Bayonne Bridge carried about 4,500 vehicles per day. The E-ZPass automatic collection system was used by 91% of drivers for toll payment. In 2011, it carried an average of 19,378 vehicles per day, which dropped to a daily average of 15,221 vehicles in 2014 after construction started, and further to 10,840 in 2015. The Bayonne Bridge is more lightly trafficked than any other Port Authority crossing.

In September 2007, MTA Regional Bus Operations began a limited-stop bus route (the S89) that crosses the bridge. The route's termini are the Hylan Boulevard bus terminal in Eltingville, Staten Island and the 34th Street Hudson-Bergen Light Rail Station in Bayonne. This is the first interstate bus service offered by the Metropolitan Transportation Authority.

== Tolls ==
As of January 4, 2026, the toll going from New Jersey to New York City is $23.30 for cars and motorcycles with toll-by-plate or E-ZPasses issued by agencies outside of New York and New Jersey. New Jersey and New York–issued E-ZPass users are charged $14.79 for cars and $13.79 for motorcycles during off-peak hours, and $16.79 for cars and $15.79 for motorcycles during peak hours. E-ZPass Mid-Tier users are charged $19.55 for cars and $19.05 for motorcycles. There is no toll for passenger vehicles going from New York City to New Jersey.

Tolls are collected only for southbound traffic. Originally, tolls were collected in both directions. In August 1970, the toll was abolished for northbound drivers, and at the same time, southbound drivers saw their tolls doubled. The tolls of eleven other New York–New Jersey and Hudson River crossings along a 130-mile (210 km) stretch, from the Outerbridge Crossing in the south to the Rip Van Winkle Bridge in the north, were changed to eastbound-only at that time.

Open-road cashless tolling began on February 20, 2017. The tollbooths were dismantled, and replaced by a toll gantry at the Staten Island end of the bridge. A vehicle without E-ZPass has a picture taken of its license plate and a bill for the toll is mailed to its owner. For E-ZPass users, sensors detect their transponders wirelessly.

=== Historical toll rates ===
Historical tolls for the Bayonne Bridge (Note: This table lists the peak tolls for two-axle vehicles. Motorcycle tolls and off-peak tolls are lower, and tolls for vehicles with additional axles are higher.)
Years	Toll		Toll equivalent in 2025		Direction collected	Ref.
Years	Cash	E-ZPass	Cash	E-ZPass		
1931–1970	$0.50	—N/a	$10.59–4.15	—N/a	each direction	
1970–1975	$1.00	—N/a	$8.29–5.98	—N/a	southbound only	
1975–1983	$1.50	—N/a	$8.97–5.86	—N/a	southbound only	
1983–1987	$2.00	—N/a	$7.82–5.67	—N/a	southbound only	
1987–1991	$3.00	—N/a	$8.50–7.09	—N/a	southbound only	
1991–2001	$4.00	$4.00	$9.46–7.27	$9.46–7.27	southbound only	
2001–2008	$6.00	$5.00	$10.91–8.97	$9.09–7.48	southbound only	
2008–2011	$8.00	$8.00	$11.96–11.45	$11.96–11.45	southbound only	
2011–2012	$12.00	$9.50	$17.17–16.83	$13.60–13.32	southbound only	
2012–2014	$13.00	$10.25	$18.23–17.68	$14.37–13.94	southbound only	
2014–2015	$14.00	$11.75	$19.04–19.02	$16.82–15.96	southbound only	
2015–2020	$15.00	$12.50	$20.37–18.66	$16.77–15.55	southbound only	
2020–2023	$16.00	$13.75	$19.90–17.60	$17.11–14.53	southbound only	
2023–2024	$17.00	$14.75	$17.96–17.45	$15.59–15.14	southbound only	
2024–2025	$17.63	$15.38	$17.63	$15.38	southbound only	
January–July 2025	$18.31	$16.06	$18.31	$16.06	southbound only	
July 2025 – January 2026	$22.38	$16.06	$22.38	$16.06	southbound only	
Since January 2026	$23.30	$16.79	$23.30	$16.79	southbound only	

== In popular culture ==
The Bayonne Bridge appears in the 2005 science fiction film War of the Worlds, being shown in the background several times in the scenes set in the lead character's Bayonne home; it is then destroyed in an attack by aliens. The bridge and surrounding Bayonne community was also featured in the 2001 film A Beautiful Mind and the HBO prison drama Oz.

== See also ==
- List of bridges documented by the Historic American Engineering Record in New Jersey
- List of bridges documented by the Historic American Engineering Record in New York
- List of bridges, tunnels, and cuts in Hudson County, New Jersey
