= Rahway River Bridge =

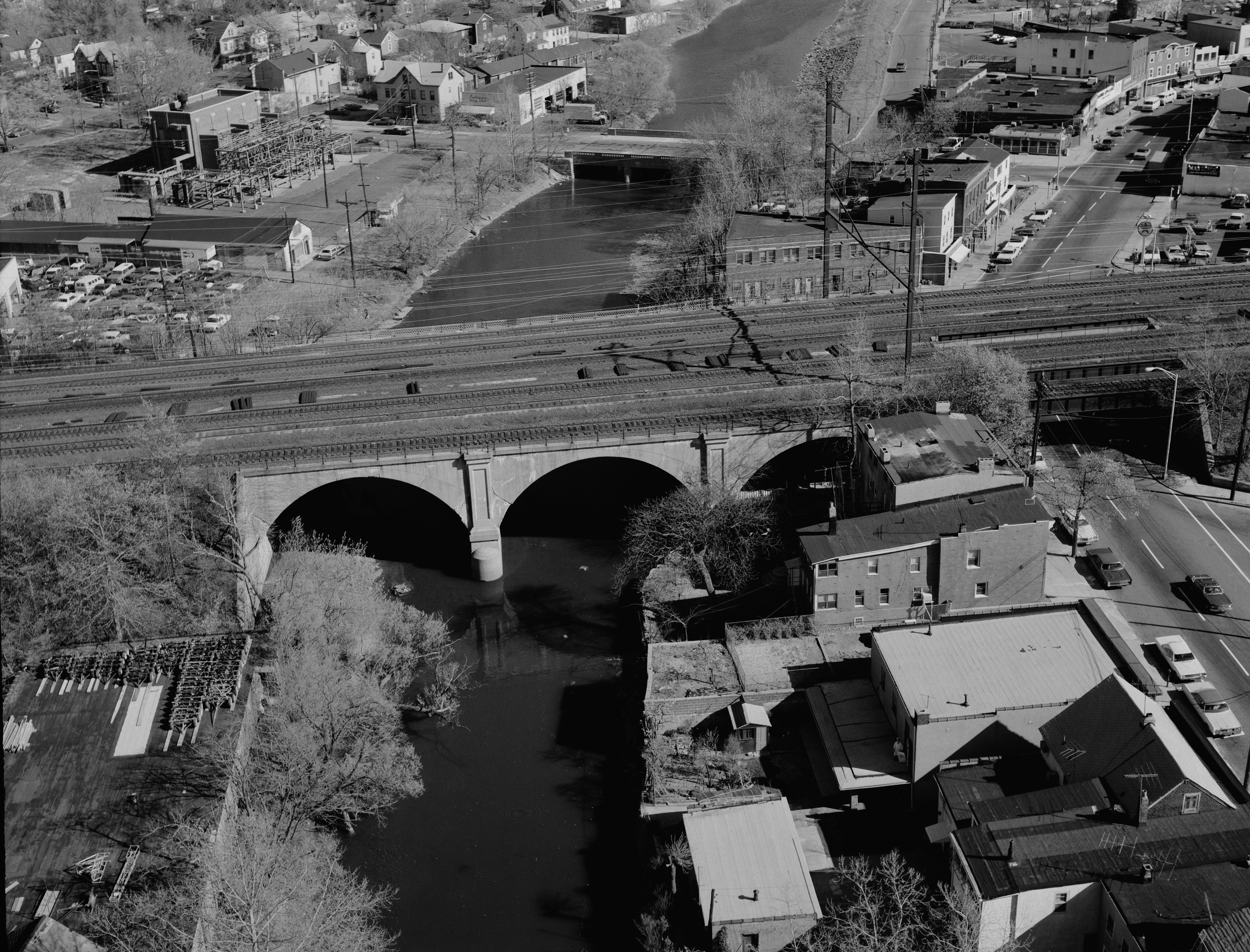
- Coordinates: 40°36′33″N 74°16′25″W
- Carries: Northeast Corridor
- Crosses: Rahway River
- Locale: Rahway; Union County, New Jersey
- Owner: New Jersey Transit

Characteristics
- Design: Closed-spandrel arch
- Material: Stone, concrete
- Total length: 180 feet (55 m)
- Width: 120 feet (37 m)
- Longest span: 60 feet (18 m)

History
- Engineering design by: A.C. Shard
- Constructed by: Keystone State Construction
- Construction end: 1915

The Rahway River Bridge is a rail bridge over the Rahway River, in Rahway, Union County, New Jersey, U.S., a few blocks north of Rahway station, on the Northeast Corridor (NEC).

The arch bridge was built circa 1915 by the Pennsylvania Railroad at the time it was widening and elevating the tracks on a viaduct on its mainline through New Jersey, a project that had been initiated in 1901.

The bridge carries the NEC and is located at MP 19.13 of the New York Division. It is used by Amtrak, including Northeast Regional and Keystone Service, and New Jersey Transit's Northeast Corridor Line and North Jersey Coast Line, which junction near Union Tower to the south.

The bridge was documented by the Historic American Engineering Record in 1977. It is part of the unlisted Pennsylvania Railroad New York to Philadelphia Historic District (ID#4568), designated in 2002 by the New Jersey State Historic Preservation Office.

== See also ==
- List of crossings of the Rahway River
- List of NJT movable bridges
- List of bridges documented by the Historic American Engineering Record in New Jersey
- List of Northeast Corridor infrastructure
- Perth Amboy and Woodbridge Railroad
- Rahway River Parkway
