= Goethals Bridge (1928–2017) =

Bridge in New Jersey and New York

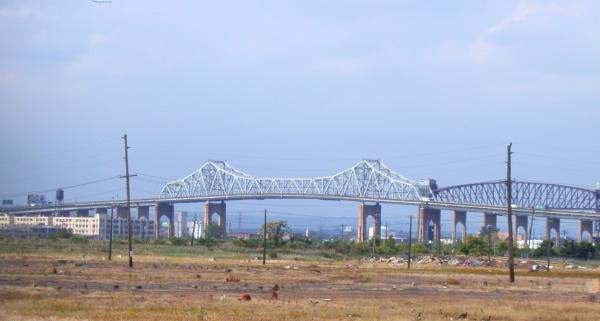
- The Goethals Bridge, seen from Staten Island
- Coordinates: 40°38′09″N 74°11′49″W
- Carries: 4 lanes of I-278
- Crosses: Arthur Kill
- Locale: Elizabeth, New Jersey, and Staten Island, New York, U.S.
- Maintained by: Port Authority of New York and New Jersey

Characteristics
- Design: Cantilever bridge
- Total length: 7,109 ft (2,167 m)
- Width: 62 ft (19 m)
- Longest span: 672 ft (205 m)
- Clearance above: 14 ft (4.3 m)
- Clearance below: 140 ft (43 m)

History
- Opened: June 29, 1928; 97 years ago
- Closed: June 9, 2017; 8 years ago

Statistics
- Daily traffic: 77,092 (2008)
- Toll: (eastbound) Cars $8.00 Cash, $8.00 peak with (E-ZPass), $6.00 off-peak with (E-ZPass)

Location
- Interactive map of Goethals Bridge

The original Goethals Bridge (/ˈɡɒθəlz/) spanned the Arthur Kill, connecting Elizabeth, New Jersey, to Staten Island, New York, United States (near the Howland Hook Marine Terminal). In 2017, it was replaced by the New Goethals Bridge and later demolished.

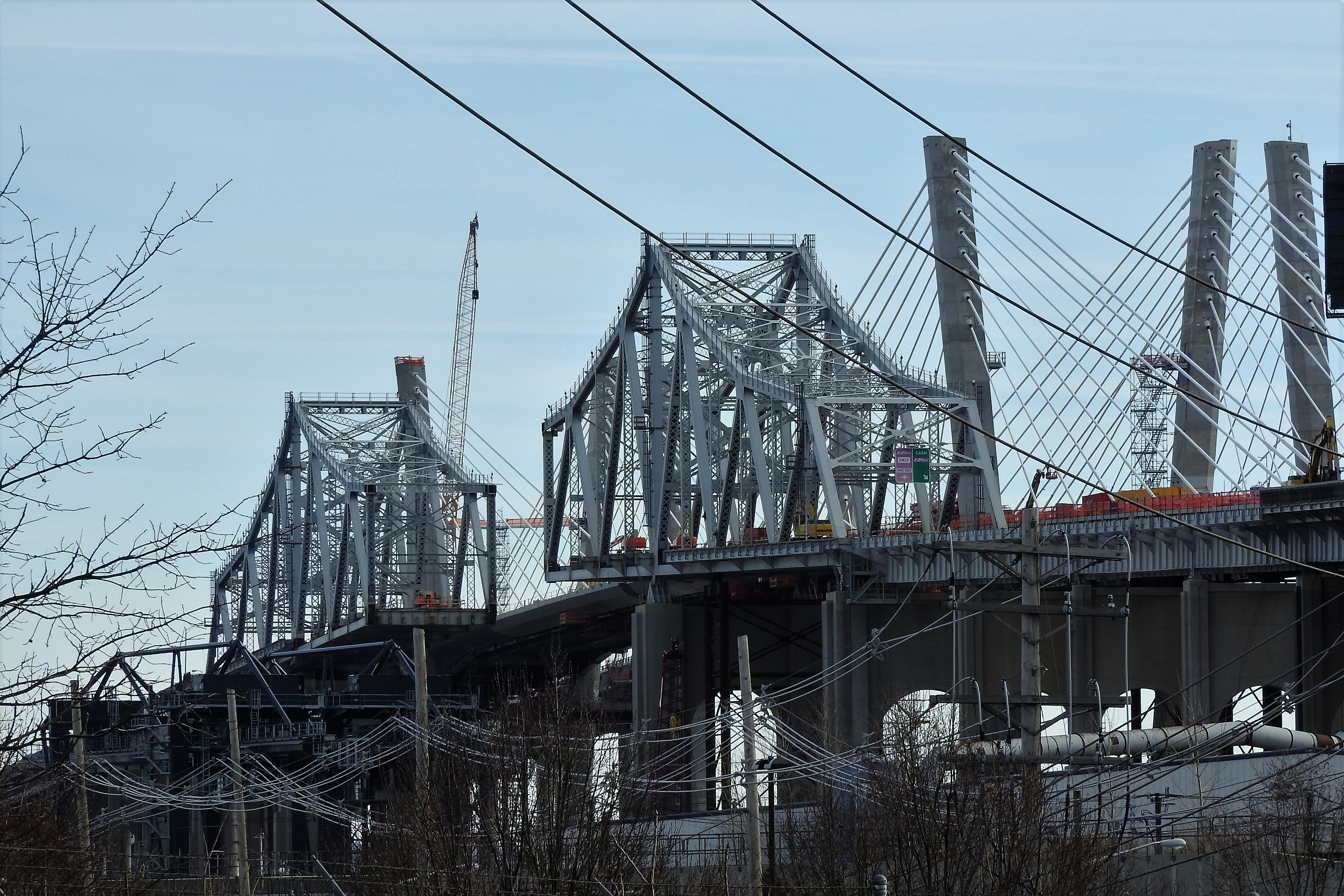
Bridge partially demolished, January 2018

A steel truss cantilever design by John Alexander Low Waddell, who also designed the Outerbridge Crossing. The bridge's 672 ft (205 m) long central span, 7,109 feet (2,168 m) long in total, 62 feet (19 m) wide, had a clearance of 135 feet (41.1 m) and carried four lanes for traffic. The Port Authority had $3 million of state money and raised $14 million in bonds to build the Goethals Bridge and the Outerbridge Crossing; the Goethals Bridge's construction began on September 1, 1925 and cost $7.2 million. It and the Outerbridge Crossing opened on June 29, 1928. Upon approval of the designs in January 1925, the original plan was to honor Benjamin Franklin Cresson Jr., a former Port Authority engineer in the name of the bridge. The Goethals Bridge replaced three ferries and is the immediate neighbor of the Arthur Kill Rail Bridge. Its unusually high mid-span height was a requirement of the New Jersey ports.

The span was one of the first structures built by the Port Authority of New York and New Jersey. On the New Jersey side it was located 2 exits south of the terminus for the New Jersey Turnpike-Newark Bay Extension. The bridge had been grandfathered into Interstate 278, and named for Major General George Washington Goethals, who supervised construction of the Panama Canal and was the first consulting engineer of the Port Authority.

Connecting onto the New Jersey Turnpike, it has been one of the main routes for traffic between there and Brooklyn via the Staten Island Expressway and the Verrazzano–Narrows Bridge. Until the Verrazzano–Narrows Bridge was completed in 1964 the Goethals Bridge never turned a profit. The same happened to the Outerbridge Crossing. The total traffic in 2002 was 15.68 million vehicles.
