= Outerbridge Crossing =

Bridge between New Jersey and New York

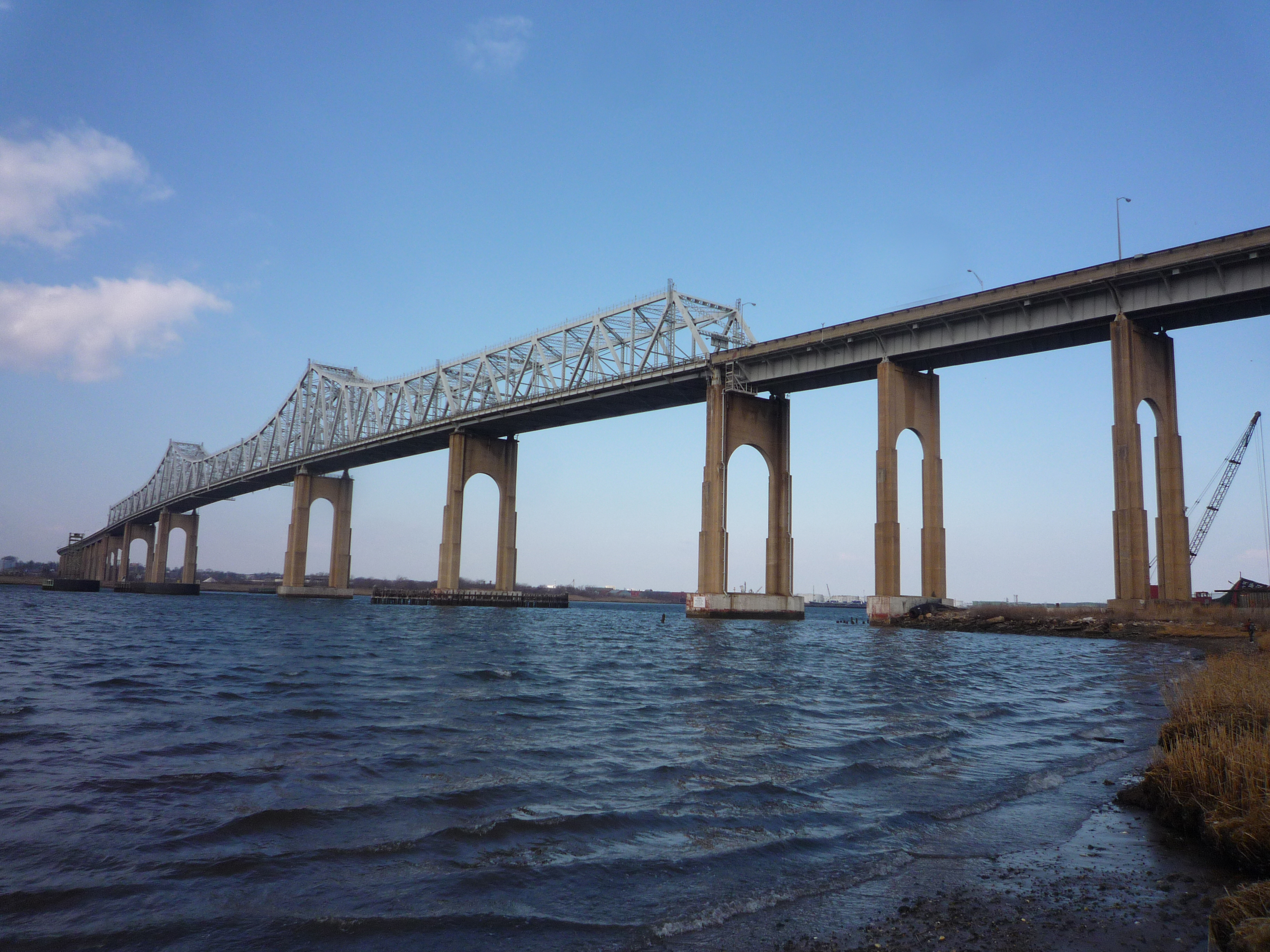
- Outerbridge Crossing looking northwest towards New Jersey
- Coordinates: 40.525°N 74.247°W
- Carries: 4 lanes of NY 440 (NY side) / Route 440
- Crosses: Arthur Kill
- Locale: Perth Amboy, New Jersey, and Staten Island, New York, U.S.
- Maintained by: Port Authority of New York and New Jersey

Characteristics
- Design: Steel cantilever bridge
- Total length: 8,800 feet (2,682 m)
- Width: 62 feet (18.9 m)
- Longest span: 750 feet (229 m)
- Clearance above: 14 feet (4.3 m)
- Clearance below: 143 feet (43.6 m)

History
- Opened: June 29, 1928; 98 years ago

Statistics
- Daily traffic: 77,107 (2016)
- Toll: For cars, eastbound only, as of January 4, 2026: Tolls by Mail: $23.30; E-ZPass Mid-Tier: $19.55; E-ZPass Peak: $16.79 (Weekdays: 6‍–‍10 am & 4‍–‍8 pm; Weekends: 11 am‍–‍9 pm); E-ZPass Off-peak: $14.79; Registered commuter: $6.88

Location
- Interactive map of Outerbridge Crossing

The Outerbridge Crossing, also known as the Outerbridge, is a cantilever bridge that spans the Arthur Kill between Perth Amboy, New Jersey, and Staten Island, New York, United States. It carries New York State Route 440 and New Jersey Route 440, with the two roads connecting at the state border at the river's center. The Outerbridge Crossing is one of three vehicular bridges connecting New Jersey with Staten Island, and like the others, is maintained and operated by the Port Authority of New York and New Jersey. The others are the Bayonne Bridge (also carrying Route 440), which connects Staten Island with Bayonne, and the Goethals Bridge (carrying Interstate 278), which connects the island with Elizabeth.

== Description ==
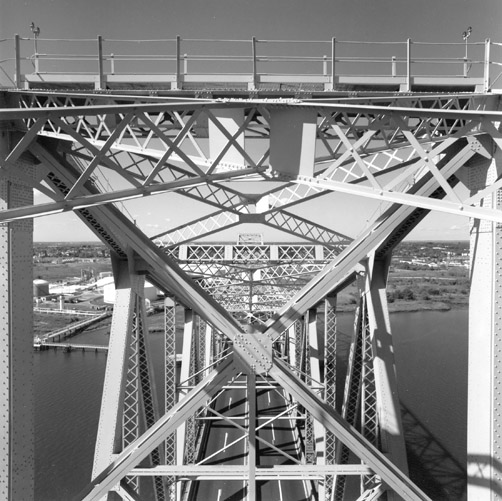
View from top of tower through truss work

Constructed from 1925 to 1928, the bridge was named for Eugenius Harvey Outerbridge, the first chairman of the then–Port of New York Authority and a resident of Staten Island. Rather than calling it the "Outerbridge Bridge", the span was labeled a "crossing". The bridge's etymology is sometimes incorrectly attributed to the fact that the Outerbridge Crossing is the most remote bridge in New York City and the southernmost crossing in New York state.

The bridge is of a steel cantilever construction, designed by John Alexander Low Waddell and built under the auspices of the Port of New York Authority, now the Port Authority of New York and New Jersey, which currently operates it. It opened simultaneously with the first Goethals Bridge on June 29, 1928. Both spans had similar designs prior to replacement of the Goethals with the current cable-stayed bridge in 2018. Neither bridge saw high traffic counts until the opening of the Verrazzano–Narrows Bridge in 1964. Traffic counts on both bridges were also depressed due to the effects of the Great Depression and World War II.

The Outerbridge Crossing has undergone numerous repairs as a result of the high volume of traffic that crosses the bridge each day.

On March 2, 2017, Port Authority Executive Director Patrick Foye announced the funding of a study into a potential replacement bridge. The National Transportation Safety Board recommended in early 2025 that the bridge undergo a structural vulnerability assessment, following the Francis Scott Key Bridge collapse in Maryland the previous year. Also in 2025, the Port Authority announced that a study into widening the bridge had been completed at a cost of $8.3 million and would be released later that year.

== Traffic ==
13,663,764 vehicles used the Outerbridge Crossing in 2025 going eastbound, representing 12.27% of traffic on bridges operated by the Port Authority. This would average to 38,381 cars going eastbound on a daily basis.

== Tolls ==
As of January 4, 2026, the toll going from New Jersey to New York City is $23.30 for cars and motorcycles with toll-by-plate or E-ZPasses issued by agencies outside of New York and New Jersey. New Jersey and New York–issued E-ZPass users are charged $14.79 for cars and $13.79 for motorcycles during off-peak hours, and $16.79 for cars and $15.79 for motorcycles during peak hours. E-ZPass Mid-Tier users are charged $19.55 for cars and $19.05 for motorcycles. There is no toll for passenger vehicles going from New York City to New Jersey.

Tolls are only collected for eastbound traffic. Originally, tolls were collected in both directions. In August 1970, the toll was abolished for westbound drivers, and at the same time, eastbound drivers saw their tolls doubled. The tolls of eleven other New York–New Jersey and Hudson River crossings along a 130-mile (210 km) stretch, from the Outerbridge Crossing in the south to the Rip Van Winkle Bridge in the north, were also changed to south- or eastbound-only at that time.

In 2003, the Port Authority raised the speed limit for the three inner E-ZPass lanes at the toll plaza from 15 to 25 miles per hour (25 to 40 km/h), separating these lanes from the rest of the eight-lane toll plaza by a barrier. Two years later, the tollbooths adjacent to the 25-mph E-ZPass lanes were removed and overhead gantries were installed with electronic tag readers to permit E-ZPass vehicles to travel at 45 miles per hour (70 km/h) in special high-speed lanes. Motorists using the high-speed E-ZPass lanes cannot use exit 1 to Page Avenue, which is located immediately after the toll plaza.

Open road tolling began on April 24, 2019. The tollbooths were dismantled, and drivers are no longer able to pay cash at the bridge. Instead, there are cameras mounted onto new overhead gantries located on the Staten Island side. A vehicle without E-ZPass has a picture taken of its license plate and a bill for the toll is mailed to its owner. For E-ZPass users, sensors detect their transponders wirelessly.

== See also ==
- List of bridges documented by the Historic American Engineering Record in New Jersey
- List of bridges documented by the Historic American Engineering Record in New York (state)
