= Delaware River Bridge (Lehigh Valley Railroad) =

Lehigh Valley Railroad Bridge
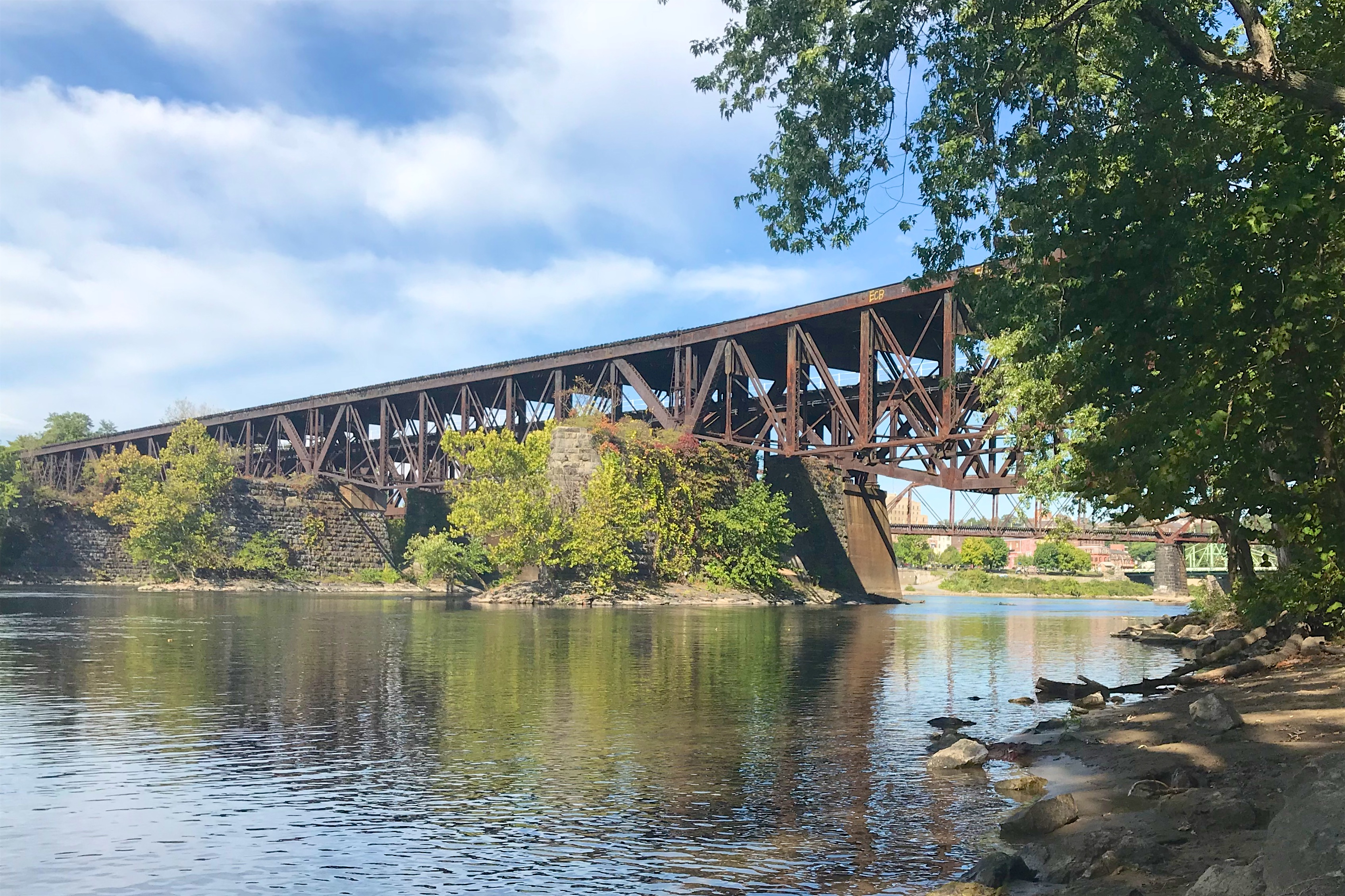
- Coordinates: 40°41′15″N 75°12′08″W
- Crosses: Delaware River
- Locale: Easton, Pennsylvania and Phillipsburg, New Jersey

Location
- Interactive map of Lehigh Valley Railroad Bridge

The Lehigh Valley Railroad, Delaware River Bridge is an abandoned railway bridge originally built by the Lehigh Valley Railroad over the Delaware River between Easton, Pennsylvania and Phillipsburg, New Jersey. It was constructed by the American Bridge Company in 1901 and 1902 on piers built in 1866.

== See also ==
- List of bridges documented by the Historic American Engineering Record in New Jersey
- List of bridges documented by the Historic American Engineering Record in Pennsylvania
- List of crossings of the Delaware River
- Lehigh Line (Norfolk Southern)
