= Raccoon Creek (New Jersey) =

Tributary of the Delaware River in Gloucester County, New Jersey

Coordinates: 39.7425°N 75.2653°W

Raccoon Creek is a 22.6-mile-long (36.4 km) tributary of the Delaware River in Gloucester County, New Jersey.

== Location ==
Raccoon Creek rises to the west of Glassboro, and flows west, meeting Cartwheel Brook at Wrights Mill. Just below, it is impounded to form Gilman Lake. It turns to the north and is again dammed to form Ewan Lake. Clems Run and Miery Run empty into the stream, which is steeply banked on the east side. It flows through Mullica Hill (formerly the head of navigation), where it is dammed to form Mullica Hill Pond, and turns west again, flowing through a wide but steep valley. The South Branch (of the creek) joins it about 1.5 miles (2.4 km) east of the town. Flowing along the north side of Swedesboro, the creek becomes tidal and passes under the Locke Avenue Bridge, a swing bridge replaced in 2002 by a fixed span. The creek turns north again and meanders through the marshlands, passing under the (fixed) Interstate 295 bridge and running along the west side of the Pureland Industrial Complex, one of the largest industrial parks in the United States. A tangle of marshy channels leads to the west side of Bridgeport, where the creek passes under moveable spans of the Conrail's Penns Grove Secondary and U.S. Route 130. It empties into the Delaware River just south of the Commodore Barry Bridge where it crosses Raccoon Island, (now connected to the mainland by fill).

== History ==
During the 17th century, Swedish settlers from the Swedish colony of New Sweden came upstream along Raccoon Creek to found and settle the communities of Bridgeport (originally called New Stockholm) and Swedesboro.

== Tributaries ==
- South Branch (Raccoon Creek)
- Miery Run
- Clems Run
- Cartwheel Brook

== See also ==
- List of rivers of New Jersey
