= List of bridges documented by the Historic American Engineering Record in New Jersey =

This is a list of bridges documented by the Historic American Engineering Record in the U.S. state of New Jersey.

== Bridges ==
Survey No.	Name (as assigned by HAER)	Status	Type	Built	Documented	Carries	Crosses	Location	County	Coordinates
NJ-18	Fink Through-Truss Bridge	Demolished	Fink truss	1858	1971	River Road	South Branch Raritan River	Hamden	Hunterdon	40°36′14″N 74°54′08″W
NJ-19	West Main Street Bridge	Extant	Pratt truss	1870	1971	Main Street	South Branch Raritan River	Clinton	Hunterdon	40°38′10″N 74°54′44″W
NJ-20	Maurice River Pratt Through-Truss Swing Bridge	Demolished	Swing span	1888	1983	CR 676 (Highland Street)	Maurice River	Mauricetown	Cumberland	40°38′10″N 74°54′44″W
NJ-25-A	Erie Railway, New York Division, Bridge 8.04 (c. 1875)	Demolished	Swing span	1871		Former Erie Railroad Newark Branch	Passaic River	Newark and Kearny	Essex and Hudson counties	40°45′16″N 74°09′52″W
NJ-25-B	Erie Railway, New York Division, Bridge 8.04 (c. 1900)	Extant	Strauss bascule	1922		Former Erie Railroad Newark Branch	Passaic River	Newark and Kearny	Essex and Hudson counties	40°45′16″N 74°09′52″W
NJ-31	Neshanic Station Lenticular Truss Bridge	Extant	Lenticular truss	1896	1983	CR 567 (Elm Street)	South Branch Raritan River	Neshanic Station	Somerset	40°30′34″N 74°43′37″W
NJ-34	Pulaski Skyway	Extant	Viaduct	1932	1983	US 1-9	Passaic and Hackensack rivers	Newark and Jersey City	Essex and Hudson counties	40°44′05″N 74°06′30″W
NJ-35	Abbett Avenue Bridge	Demolished	Pratt truss	1896	1983	Abbett Avenue	Whippany River	Morristown	Morris	40°48′05″N 74°28′19″W
NJ-37	Central Railroad of New Jersey, Newark Bay Lift Bridge	Demolished	Vertical-lift bridge	1926	1984	Former Central Railroad of New Jersey	Newark Bay	Elizabeth and Bayonne	Union and Essex counties	40°39′16″N 74°09′00″W
NJ-39	South Broad Street Bridge	Extant	Stone arch	1874	1982	South Broad Street	Elizabeth River	Elizabeth	Union	40°39′40″N 74°12′55″W
NJ-40	Northeast Railroad Corridor, including: Raritan River Bridge; Rahway River Bridge	Extant	Stone arch	1903; 1915	1977	Northeast Corridor	Raritan River; Rahway River	New Brunswick and Highland Park; Rahway	Middlesex and Union; Union	40°30′04″N 74°26′28″W; 40°36′33″N 74°16′25″W
NJ-42	Erie & Lackawanna Railroad Bridge	Extant	Vertical-lift bridge	1920	1984	New Jersey Transit Morristown Line	Hackensack River	Kearny and Jersey City	Hudson	40°44′35″N 74°04′37″W
NJ-43	Conrail Bridge	Extant	Vertical-lift bridge	1920	1984	Passaic and Harsimus Line	Hackensack River	Kearny and Jersey City	Hudson	40°44′25″N 74°04′54″W
NJ-44	PATH Transit System Bridge	Extant	Vertical-lift bridge	1920	1984	Port Authority Trans-Hudson	Hackensack River	Kearny and Jersey City	Hudson	40°44′24″N 74°04′59″W
NJ-49-A	Greenville Yard, Transfer Bridge System	Extant	Transfer bridge	1904	1995	New York New Jersey Rail	Upper New York Bay	Jersey City	Hudson	40°40′44″N 74°04′24″W
NJ-50	Delaware, Lackawanna and Western Railroad, Pier No. 6	Demolished	Trestle	1900	1985	Delaware, Lackawanna and Western Railroad	Hudson River	Jersey City	Hudson	40°43′52″N 74°01′51″W
NJ-52	Grove Street Bridge	Demolished	Reinforced concrete girder	1913	1985	Grove Street	Lackawanna Terminal tracks	Montclair	Essex	40°48′39″N 74°12′44″W
NJ-54	Jackson Street Bridge	Rehabilitated	Swing span	1898	1985	Jackson Street	Passaic River	Newark and Harrison	Essex and Hudson counties	40°44′01″N 74°09′19″W
NJ-56	Califon Bridge	Extant	Pratt truss	1887	1986	CR 512 (Main Street)	South Branch Raritan River	Califon	Hunterdon	40°43′14″N 74°50′16″W
NJ-57	Finderne Avenue Bridge	Extant	Warren truss	1913	1985	CR 533 (Finderne Avenue)	NJ Transit Raritan Valley Line	Bridgewater Township	Somerset	40°33′35″N 74°34′50″W
NJ-59	Delaware, Lackawanna and Western Railroad and Ferry Terminal, Ferry Slips and Bridges	Extant	Transfer bridge	1907	1983	Delaware, Lackawanna and Western Railroad	Hudson River	Hoboken	Hudson	40°44′06″N 74°01′40″W
NJ-66	Bayonne Bridge	Rehabilitated	Steel arch	1931	1987	Route 440 and NY 440	Kill Van Kull	Bayonne, New Jersey, and Staten Island, New York	Hudson County, New Jersey, and Richmond County, New York	40°38′31″N 74°08′31″W
NJ-67	Delaware and Raritan Canal, Six Mile Run Culvert	Extant	Stone arch	1834	1986	Delaware and Raritan Canal	Six Mile Run	East Millstone	Somerset	40°28′22″N 74°34′17″W
NJ-68	Delaware and Raritan Canal, Ten Mile Run Culvert	Extant	Stone arch	1834	1986	Delaware and Raritan Canal	Ten Mile Run	East Millstone	Somerset	40°27′27″N 74°35′17″W
NJ-73	Lower Bank Road Bridge	Extant	Strauss bascule	1926	1990	Lower Bank Road	Mullica River	Egg Harbor City and Washington Township	Atlantic and Burlington counties	39°35′37″N 74°33′05″W
NJ-74	Landing Bridge	Extant	Pratt truss	1895	1991	CR 609 (Landing Lane)	Raritan River	New Brunswick	Middlesex	40°30′31″N 74°27′50″W
NJ-75	Maple Street Bridge	Replaced	Steel built-up girder		1992	Maple Street	NJ Transit Morris & Essex Lines	Summit	Union	40°43′01″N 74°21′33″W
NJ-76	Summit Avenue Bridge	Replaced	Steel built-up girder		1992	Summit Avenue	NJ Transit Morris & Essex Lines	Summit	Union	40°42′58″N 74°21′23″W
NJ-77	Squan Bridge	Replaced	Steel arch		1991	Allenwood-Lakewood Road	Manasquan River	Allenwood	Monmouth	40°08′13″N 74°06′28″W
NJ-80	Route 1 Extension, Southbound Viaduct	Replaced	Steel built-up girder	1932	1992	US 1-9	Oak Island Yard, etc.	Newark	Essex	40°43′7″N 74°09′14″W
NJ-81	Route 1 Extension, South Street Viaduct	Replaced	Steel built-up girder	1932	1992	South Street	Wheeler Point Road	Newark	Essex	40°43′3″N 74°09′29″W
NJ-82	Route 1 Extension, Structure No. 0703-161	Replaced	Parker truss	1932	1992	US 1-9	Richards Lane and Hawkins Street	Newark	Essex	40°43′38″N 74°08′20″W
NJ-84	Lincoln Avenue-High Street Bridge	Extant	Stone arch		1993	Lincoln Avenue and High Street	Rahway River	Cranford	Union	40°39′01″N 74°18′06″W
NJ-85	Augusta Hill Road Bridge	Extant	Pratt truss		1993	Augusta Hill Road	East Branch of Paulins Kill	Augusta	Sussex	41°07′43″N 74°43′44″W
NJ-86	Warren County Bridge No. 19005	Extant	Pratt truss			Lock Street	Lopatcong Creek	Phillipsburg	Warren	40°41′5″N 75°09′45″W
NJ-87	Stafford Avenue Bridge	Abandoned	Timber stringer	1871	1991	Stafford Avenue		Manahawkin	Ocean	39°41′02″N 74°12′27″W
NJ-88	New Bridge Road Alloways Creek Bridge	Extant	Swing span	1905	1991	CR 623 (New Bridge Road)	Alloways Creek	Hancock's Bridge	Salem	39°31′41″N 75°27′02″W
NJ-89	State Route 50 Bascule Bridge	Demolished	Strauss bascule	1926	1992	Route 50 (Mount Pleasant-Tuckahoe Road)	Tuckahoe River	Tuckahoe and Corbin City	Cape May and Atlantic counties	39°17′42″N 74°45′08″W
NJ-91	New Hampton Bridge	Extant	Pratt truss	1868	1991	Shoddy Mill Road	Musconetcong River	New Hampton	Hunterdon	40°43′14″N 74°57′49″W
NJ-92	Glen Gardner Bridge	Extant	Pratt truss	1870	1991	School Street	Spruce Run	Glen Gardner	Hunterdon	40°42′05″N 74°56′36″W
NJ-93	Doty Road Bridge	Replaced	Pratt truss	1891	1999	Doty Road	Ramapo River	Oakland	Bergen	41°01′00″N 74°15′39″W
NJ-94	Highland Avenue and Baldwin Street Bridge	Replaced	Steel built-up girder			Highland Avenue and Baldwin Street	NJ Transit Montclair-Boonton Line	Glen Ridge	Essex	40°48′32″N 74°12′16″W
NJ-96	Passaic River Bridge	Extant	Reinforced concrete open-spandrel arch		1993	US 46	Passaic River	Paterson and Elmwood Park	Passaic and Bergen counties	40°53′38″N 74°07′44″W
NJ-97	River Drive Overpass	Extant	Steel built-up girder		1993	US 46	CR 507 (River Drive)	Elmwood Park	Bergen	40°53′37″N 74°07′36″W
NJ-99	Little Falls Turnpike Overpass	Extant	Steel built-up girder		1993	US 46	CR 639 (McBride Avenue)	Little Falls	Passaic	40°53′21″N 74°13′07″W
NJ-100	Passaic River Bridge	Extant	Reinforced concrete open-spandrel arch		1993	US 46	Passaic River	Little Falls and Totowa	Passaic	40°53′25″N 74°13′12″W
NJ-102	Osborn Avenue Bridge	Replaced	Warren truss	1907	1993	Tuttle Parkway	NJ Transit Raritan Valley Line	Westfield	Union	40°38′54″N 74°21′25″W
NJ-104	National Docks Branch Bridge N.D.2F	Replaced	Pratt truss	1908	1995	National Docks Secondary	Former Central Railroad of New Jersey	Jersey City	Hudson	40°42′34″N 74°03′24″W
NJ-106	New Jersey Route 35 Bridge	Replaced	Steel built-up girder	1937	1996	US 9 southbound	US 1 (Jansen Avenue) northbound	Woodbridge Township	Hudson	40°33′54″N 74°17′52″W
NJ-110	Locke Avenue Bridge	Replaced	Swing span	1911	1996	CR 671 (Locke Avenue)	Raccoon Creek	Swedesboro	Gloucester	39°45′19″N 75°19′00″W
NJ-111	Crossway Place Bridge	Replaced	Steel rolled stringer	1874	1996	NJ Transit Raritan Valley Line	Crossway Place	Westfield	Union	40°38′50″N 74°21′51″W
NJ-112	Rue Road Bridge	Replaced	Warren truss	1910		Rue Road	Matchaponix Brook	Monroe Township	Middlesex	40°20′23″N 74°22′22″W
NJ-115	Crescent Boulevard Bridge No. 0406153	Extant	Steel built-up girder	1926	1997	US 30 / US 130 (Crescent Boulevard)	Cooper River	Jamesburg	Middlesex	39°55′37″N 75°05′02″W
NJ-119	Thomas A. Edison Bridge	Rehabilitated	Steel built-up girder	1940	1998	US 9 northbound	Raritan River	Woodbridge Township and Sayreville	Middlesex	40°30′32″N 74°18′02″W
NJ-120	Victory Bridge	Replaced	Swing span	1926	1998	Route 35 (Convery Boulevard)	Raritan River	Perth Amboy and Sayreville	Middlesex	40°30′28″N 74°17′31″W
NJ-123	State Bridge No. 0302150	Replaced	Strauss bascule	1925	1998	US 9	Bass River	New Gretna	Burlington	39°35′36″N 74°26′33″W
NJ-124	Route 31 Bridge	Replaced	Steel built-up girder	1934	1998	Route 31	NJ Transit Raritan Valley Line	Hampton	Hunterdon	40°42′35″N 74°57′02″W
NJ-126	Magnolia Avenue Viaduct	Replaced	Reinforced concrete girder	1934	1998	Magnolia Avenue	US 1-9 (Spring Street)	Elizabeth	Union	40°40′1″N 74°12′15″W
NJ-127	Belleville Turnpike Bridge	Replaced	Strauss bascule	1932	1998	Route 7 (Belleville Turnpike)	Passaic River	Belleville, Kearny, and North Arlington	Essex, Hudson, and Bergen counties	40°47′11″N 74°08′51″W
NJ-130	Route 206 Raritan River Bridge	Extant	Reinforced concrete open-spandrel arch	1929	1999	US 206	Raritan River	Somerville and Hillsborough Township	Somerset	40°33′22″N 74°36′57″W
NJ-132	Contextual Essay on Wire Bridges				1999			Trenton	Mercer	40°12′32″N 74°45′14″W
NJ-138	Twelfth Street Viaduct, State Route 139	Extant	Steel built-up girder	1932	2003	Route 139	New Jersey Turnpike	Jersey City	Hudson	40°43′51″N 74°02′58″W
NJ-140	Hoboken Avenue Viaduct, State Route 139	Extant	Steel built-up girder	1932	2003	Hoboken Avenue	Route 139	Jersey City	Hudson	40°44′19″N 74°03′38″W
NJ-142-C	Naval Ammunition Depot Earle, Trestle 2	Extant	Trestle	1945	2003	Naval Weapons Station Earle	Sandy Hook Bay	Colts Neck	Monmouth	40°27′04″N 74°03′05″W
NJ-142-D	Naval Ammunition Depot Earle, Trestle 3	Extant	Trestle	1944	2003	Naval Weapons Station Earle	Sandy Hook Bay	Colts Neck	Monmouth	40°27′12″N 74°03′07″W
NJ-143	Conrail Viaduct, State Route 139	Extant	Steel built-up girder	1932	2003	Route 139	Conrail	Jersey City	Hudson	40°44′20″N 74°03′42″W
NJ-146	Route 130 Bridge	Extant	Vertical-lift bridge		1999	US 130 (Crown Point Road)	Oldmans Creek	Logan and Oldmans townships	Gloucester and Salem counties	39°47′05″N 75°24′25″W
NY-129	George Washington Bridge	Extant	Suspension	1931	1983	I-95 / US 1-9 (entire span) / US 46 (NJ side)	Hudson River	Fort Lee, New Jersey, and Manhattan, New York	Bergen County, New Jersey, and New York County, New York	40°51′06″N 73°57′09″W
NY-304	Outerbridge Crossing	Extant	Cantilever	1928	1991	Route 440 and NY 440	Arthur Kill	Perth Amboy, New Jersey, and Staten Island, New York	Middlesex County, New Jersey, and Richmond County, New York	40°31′30″N 74°14′48″W
NY-305	Goethals Bridge	Replaced	Cantilever	1928	1991	I-278	Arthur Kill	Elizabeth, New Jersey, and Staten Island, New York	Union County, New Jersey, and Richmond County, New York	40°38′09″N 74°11′49″W
PA-15	Dingman's Ferry Bridge	Extant	Pennsylvania truss	1900	1971	CR 560 and SR 2019	Delaware River	Sandyston Township and Dingmans Ferry	Sussex County, New Jersey and Pike County, Pennsylvania	41°13′12″N 74°51′33″W
PA-31	Delaware River Bridge	Extant	Suspension	1904	1970	Delaware Road	Delaware River	Riegelsville, New Jersey, and Riegelsville, Pennsylvania	Warren County, New Jersey, and Bucks County, Pennsylvania	40°35′39″N 75°11′27″W
PA-502	Northampton Street Bridge	Extant	Cantilever	1896	1999	Northampton Street	Delaware River	Phillipsburg, New Jersey, and Easton, Pennsylvania	Warren County, New Jersey, and Northampton County, Pennsylvania	40°41′29″N 75°12′14″W
PA-512	Morrisville–Trenton Railroad Bridge	Extant	Stone arch	1903	2000	Amtrak Northeast Corridor, etc.	Delaware River	Trenton, New Jersey, and Morrisville, Pennsylvania	Mercer County, New Jersey, and Bucks County, Pennsylvania	40°12′30″N 74°46′02″W
PA-513	West Trenton Railroad Bridge	Extant	Reinforced concrete closed-spandrel arch	1913	2000	SEPTA West Trenton Line	Delaware River	Ewing Township, New Jersey, and Yardley, Pennsylvania	Mercer County, New Jersey, and Bucks County, Pennsylvania	40°14′30″N 74°49′27″W
PA-541	Delaware River Viaduct	Abandoned	Reinforced concrete open-spandrel arch	1911	2000	Former Delaware, Lackawanna and Western Railroad Lackawanna Cut-Off	Delaware River	Columbia, New Jersey, and Portland, Pennsylvania	Warren County, New Jersey, and Northampton County, Pennsylvania	40°56′15″N 75°06′21″W
PA-543	Lehigh Valley Railroad, Delaware River Bridge	Abandoned	Pratt truss	1866	2000	Former Lehigh Valley Railroad	Delaware River	Phillipsburg, New Jersey, and Easton, Pennsylvania	Warren County, New Jersey, and Northampton County, Pennsylvania	40°41′20″N 75°12′11″W
PA-545	Delair Bridge	Extant	Vertical-lift bridge	1889	2000	NJ Transit Atlantic City Line, etc.	Delaware River	Pennsauken Township, New Jersey, and Philadelphia, Pennsylvania	Camden County, New Jersey, and Philadelphia County, Pennsylvania	39°58′57″N 75°04′09″W

== See also ==
- List of tunnels documented by the Historic American Engineering Record in New Jersey
