= List of tunnels documented by the Historic American Engineering Record in New Jersey =

This is a list of tunnels documented by the Historic American Engineering Record in the U.S. state of New Jersey.

== Tunnels ==
Survey No.	Name (as assigned by HAER)	Built	Documented	Carries	Crosses	Location	County	Coordinates
NJ-109-A	New York, West Shore and Buffalo Railroad, Weehawken Tunnel	1883	1997	Hudson–Bergen Light Rail	Bergen Hill	Weehawken	Hudson	40°47′02″N 74°01′32″W
NJ-136	Delaware, Lackawanna and Western Railroad, North Bergen Tunnel	1877	2001	NJ Transit Hoboken Terminal tracks	Bergen Hill	Jersey City	Hudson	40°44′25″N 74°03′45″W
NJ-137	Delaware, Lackawanna and Western Railroad, South Bergen Tunnel	1911	2001	NJ Transit Hoboken Terminal tracks	Bergen Hill	Jersey City	Hudson	40°44′24″N 74°03′45″W
NY-161	Holland Tunnel	1927	1987	I-78 / Route 139 (NJ side)	Hudson River	Jersey City, New Jersey, and Manhattan, New York	Hudson County, New Jersey, and New York County, New York	40°43′39″N 74°01′17″W
NY-307	Lincoln Tunnel	1937	1991	Route 495 and NY 495	Hudson River	Weehawken, New Jersey and Manhattan, New York	Hudson County, New Jersey, and New York County, New York	40°45′45″N 74°00′40″W

== See also ==
- List of bridges documented by the Historic American Engineering Record in New Jersey
