= Goethals Bridge =

Bridge between New Jersey and New York

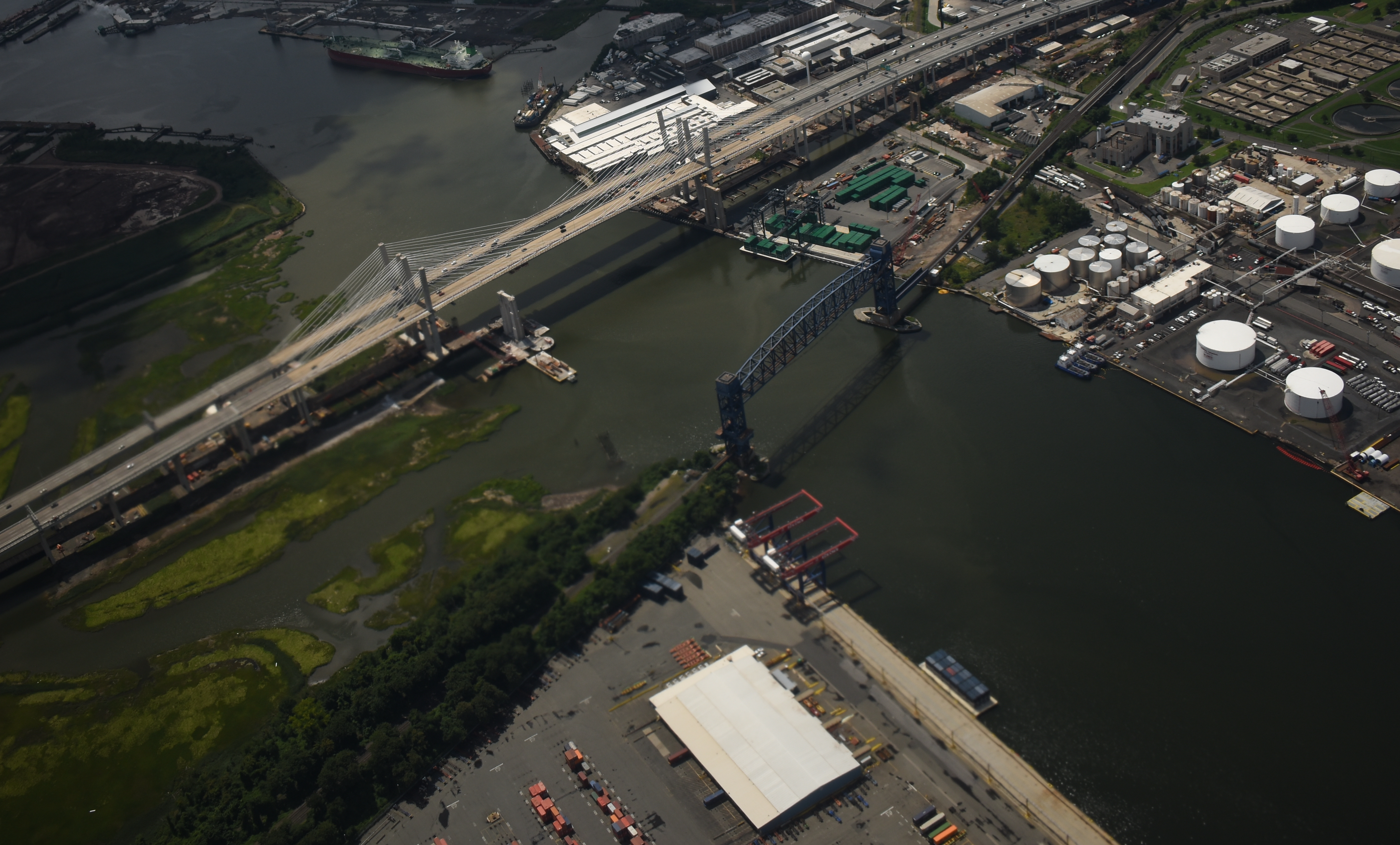
- Aerial view of the Goethals Bridge (top left) with the Arthur Kill Vertical Lift Bridge at bottom right
- Coordinates: 40°38′08″N 74°11′50″W
- Carries: 6 lanes of I-278
- Crosses: Arthur Kill
- Locale: Elizabeth, New Jersey and Howland Hook, Staten Island, New York, U.S.
- Maintained by: Port Authority of New York and New Jersey
- ID number: 3800072

Characteristics
- Design: Dual-span cable-stayed bridge
- Total length: 7,109 ft (2,167 m)
- Width: 62 ft (19 m)
- Longest span: 672 ft (205 m)
- Clearance above: 14 ft (4.3 m)
- Clearance below: 140 ft (43 m)

History
- Construction cost: $1,250,000,000 (replacement span)
- Opened: June 10, 2017; 9 years ago (eastbound); May 21, 2018; 8 years ago (westbound)
- Replaces: Goethals Bridge (1928–2017)

Statistics
- Daily traffic: 82,852 (2016)
- Toll: For cars, eastbound only, as of January 4, 2026: Tolls by Mail: $23.30; E-ZPass Mid-Tier: $19.55; E-ZPass Peak: $16.79 (Weekdays: 6‍–‍10 am & 4‍–‍8 pm; Weekends: 11 am‍–‍9 pm); E-ZPass Off-peak: $14.79; Registered commuter: $6.88

Location
- Interactive map of Goethals Bridge

The Goethals Bridge (/ˈɡoʊθəlz/ GOH-thəlz) is a pair of cable-stayed bridge spans connecting Elizabeth, New Jersey, to Staten Island, New York, United States. The spans cross a strait known as Arthur Kill, and replaced a cantilever bridge built in 1928. The bridge is operated by the Port Authority of New York and New Jersey.

The New Jersey side is about 2.5 miles (4.0 km) south of Newark Liberty International Airport. The bridge and its predecessor are named for Major General George Washington Goethals, who supervised construction of the Panama Canal and was the first consulting engineer of the Port Authority.

The eastbound span opened on June 10, 2017, at which time the original span was closed. The old cantilever span was dismantled in January 2018 and the new westbound span opened on May 21, 2018.

== Original bridge ==
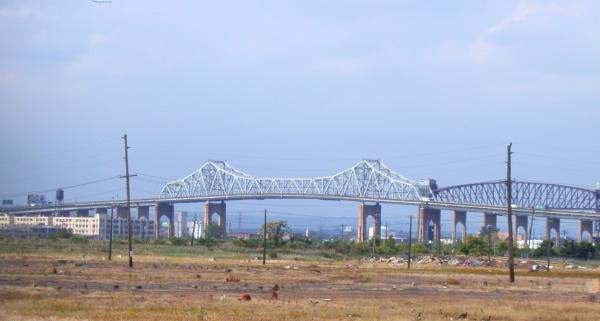
The original Goethals Bridge, seen from Staten Island in 2004

The original Goethals bridge was a four lane steel truss cantilever design by John Alexander Low Waddell, who also designed the nearby Outerbridge Crossing. It had a 672 ft (205 m) long central span, was 7,109 feet (2,167 m) long, 62 feet (19 m) wide, and had a vertical clearance of 135 feet (41 m).

== Planning for a new bridge ==
Starting in 1985, the Port Authority looked at 27 different alternatives to add capacity between Staten Island and New Jersey. By 1990, senior executives decided that the best way to accommodate growth was to build a new span, parallel to the existing Goethals Bridge. In October 1997, the Port Authority issued a final environmental impact statement, but by that time Staten Island officials had lined up against the project, citing the potential for increased traffic through their borough.

A Port Authority study initiated in 2001 suggested that the optimal solution was an entirely new span. The choosing of a full replacement option was followed by the submittal of several design alternatives, alongside a "no build" option. The new bridge design, upon the completion of the westbound span, also included additional lanes of traffic, high-speed E-ZPass lanes, and a reconstruction and widening of Interstate 278 from exit 4 in New York (NY 440 south) to Route 439 in New Jersey. The span was demolished starting in January 2018, after the opening of the replacement bridges.

== New bridge ==
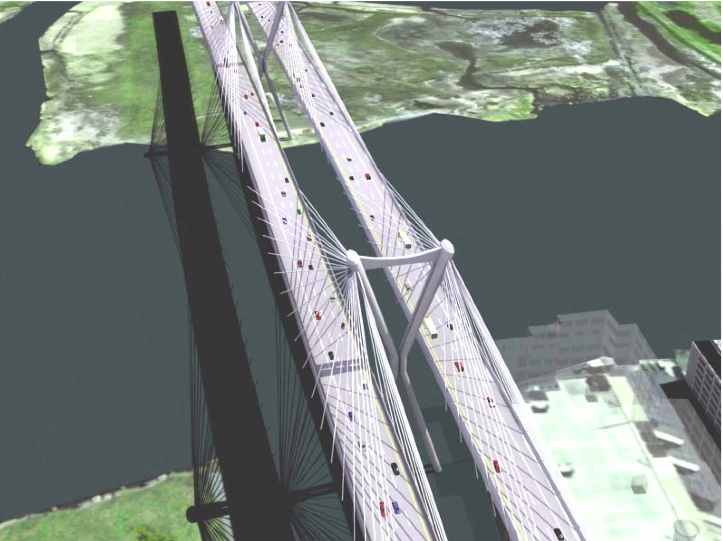
A 2007 3D rendering of one proposed replacement bridge

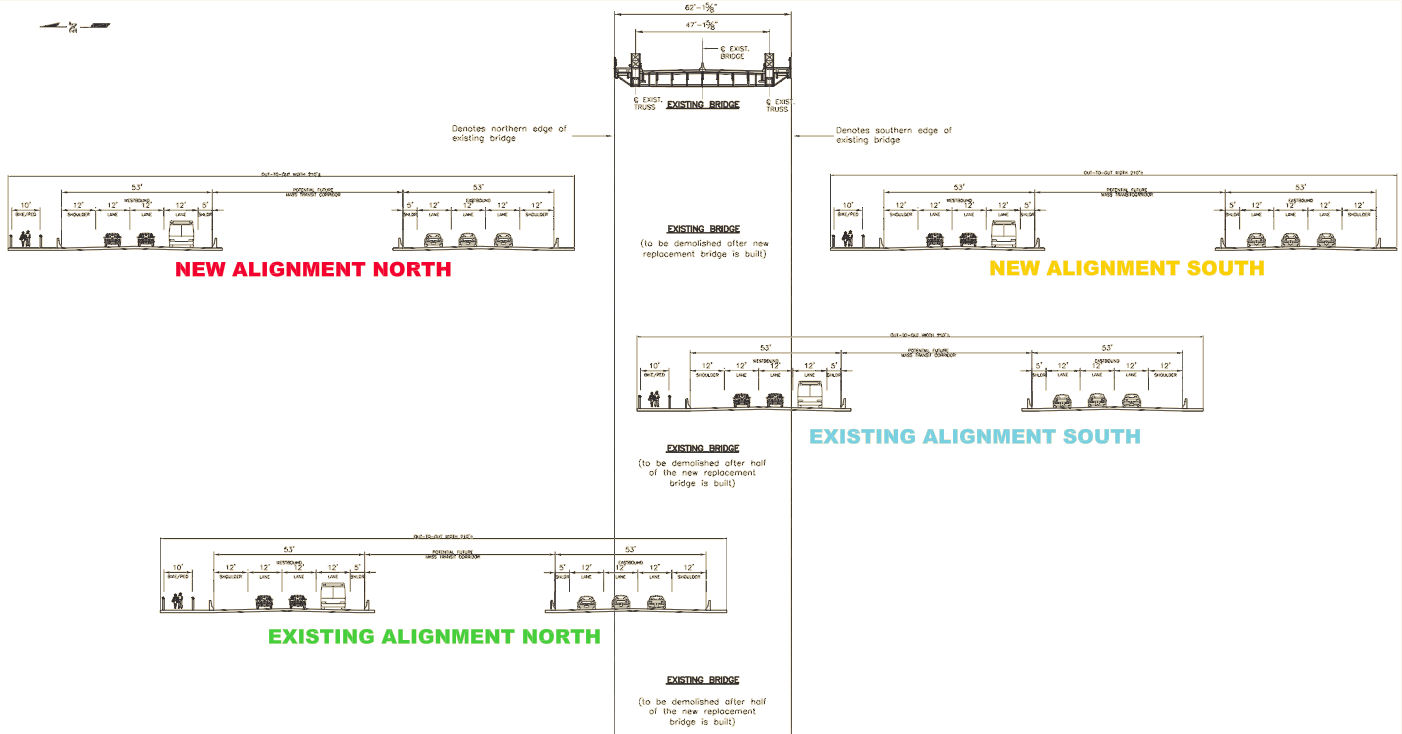
A diagram comparing the four replacement alternatives and their position relative to the old bridge

The initial alternatives put forth in mid-2006 included the option of twin three-lane replacement bridges north and south of the original alignment, which was eliminated; and twin three-lane replacement bridges (one south, and one along the original alignment), with the latter being built after the demolition of the original bridge, which was refined to be a single-span bridge instead of twin bridges. The twin-bridge alternative was dropped because of a height restriction set up by the FAA to prevent interferences with flights at Newark Liberty International Airport. The Goethals Bridge towers were not to exceed 272 feet in height and required to slant outwards because of aircraft flight patterns. This would also prevent ice from falling onto the roadway during winter months. Public open houses were held in Staten Island and Elizabeth, and the Draft Environmental Impact Statement (DEIS) was issued. Formal public hearings on the DEIS were held in July 2009.

All alternatives proposed that the bridge be single level, cable-stayed, double spans, separated by towers with a height of 135 feet (41 m) above the high-water mark of the Arthur Kill shipping channel. The 900 ft (270 m) main span of each bridge holds three 12 ft (3.7 m) lanes with a 12 ft (3.7 m) outer shoulder and 5 ft (1.5 m) inner shoulder. The westbound span features a new 10 ft (3.0 m) walkway for pedestrians and cyclists. In addition, permanent access roads would be built under the bridge on land for maintenance, security, and construction purposes. Lastly, space would be left in between the two bridges to accommodate potential mass-transit services. For mass transit, studies indicated that a bus-only lane was not economically viable but that a high-occupancy vehicle lane open to buses as well as high-occupancy autos would be appropriate during rush hours if traffic supported it. Provision for rail transit was rejected; however, planners decided that whatever alternative was constructed, the design and structural integrity should ideally be able to be retrofitted for such at a later date. The suggestion for a freight rail connection was dismissed as uneconomical.

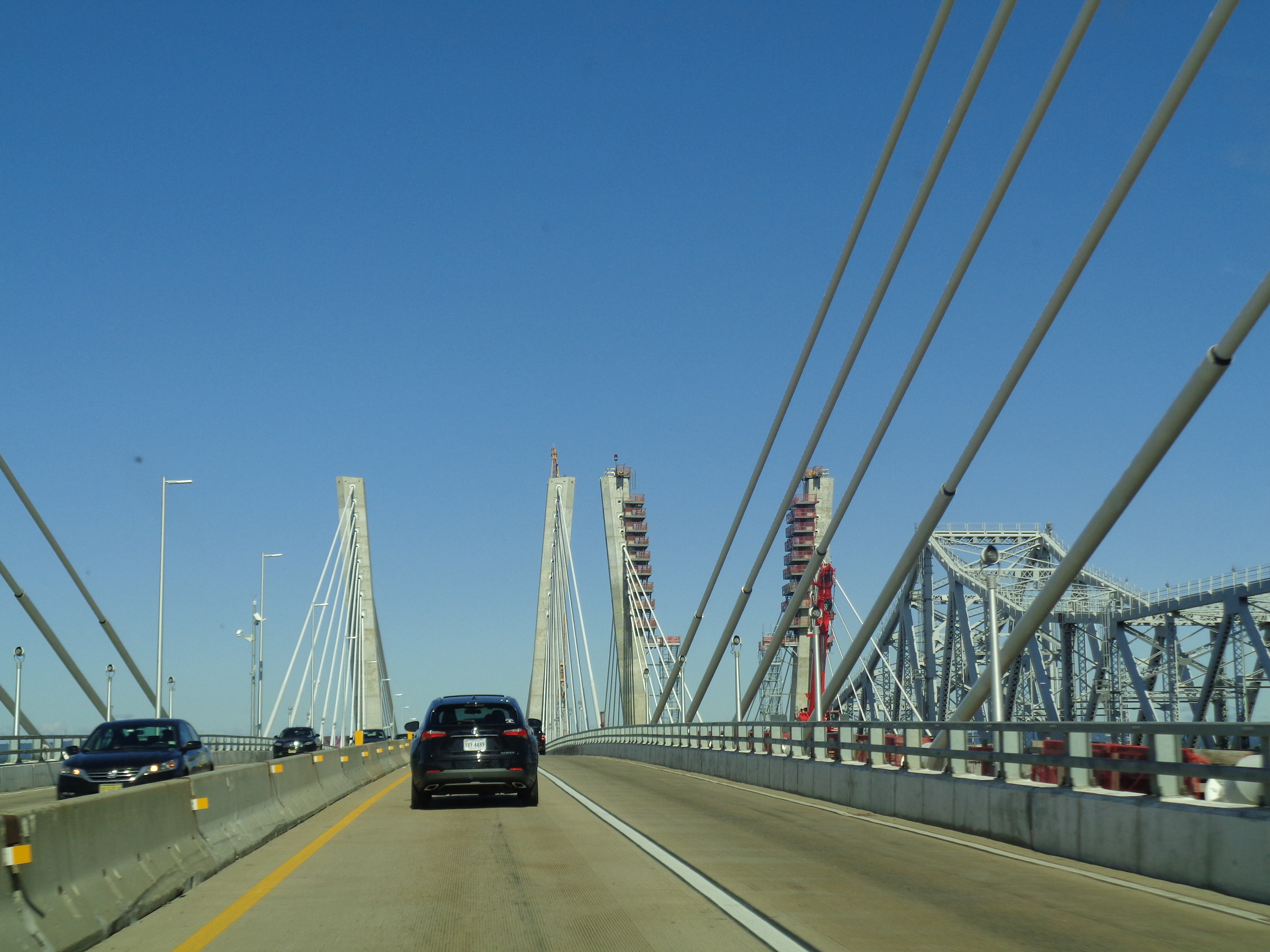
From the new eastbound bridge, looking westward

Also as part of the construction, improvements to approaches and nearby interchanges were made. These include the New Jersey Turnpike exit 13 toll plaza, the Staten Island toll plaza, and the Interstate 278/NY 440 interchange. In addition, while separate from the bridge replacement project, the New Jersey Department of Transportation may construct full movements at the Interstate 278/U.S. Route 1/9 junction to coincide with the bridge's replacement.

On April 24, 2013, the Port Authority approved the $1.5-billion Goethals Bridge Project for preliminary funding, and broke ground in May 2014. The old bridge was closed on June 9, 2017, with eastbound traffic using the new eastbound bridge starting on June 10 and westbound traffic opening the next day. Initially, the new eastbound span carried 2 lanes of traffic in each direction, with each lane 11 feet wide until the new westbound span was complete. Once completed, the new westbound span restored pedestrian and bicycle access. Westbound traffic was shifted from the new eastbound span to the newly opened westbound span on May 21, 2018. The bikeway and pedestrian walkway was set to open by mid-2018 but was then pushed back to an undetermined date. The bike path and pedestrian walkway finally opened on March 4, 2020.

The Goethals Bridge Replacement Project was given several prestigious awards upon its completion. In the highway/bridge category, the project won an ENR New York Best Projects and the Excellence in safety award, and it received the ENR New York's Project of the Year for 2018.

== Tolls ==
As of January 4, 2026, the toll going from New Jersey to New York City is $23.30 for cars and motorcycles with toll-by-plate or E-ZPasses issued by agencies outside of New York and New Jersey. New Jersey and New York–issued E-ZPass users are charged $14.79 for cars and $13.79 for motorcycles during off-peak hours, and $16.79 for cars and $15.79 for motorcycles during peak hours. E-ZPass Mid-Tier users are charged $19.55 for cars and $19.05 for motorcycles. There is no toll for passenger vehicles going from New York City to New Jersey.

Tolls are only collected for eastbound traffic. Originally, tolls were collected in both directions. In August 1970, the toll was abolished for westbound drivers, and at the same time, eastbound drivers saw their tolls doubled. The tolls of eleven other New York–New Jersey and Hudson River crossings along a 130-mile (210 km) stretch, from the Outerbridge Crossing in the south to the Rip Van Winkle Bridge in the north, were also changed to south- or eastbound-only at that time.

Open-road cashless tolling began on September 4, 2019. The tollbooths were dismantled, and drivers are no longer able to pay cash at the bridge. Instead, there are cameras mounted onto new overhead gantries located on the Staten Island side. A vehicle without E-ZPass has a picture taken of its license plate and a bill for the toll is mailed to its owner. For E-ZPass users, sensors detect their transponders wirelessly.

== See also ==
- List of bridges documented by the Historic American Engineering Record in New Jersey
- List of bridges documented by the Historic American Engineering Record in New York (state)
