= Locke Avenue Bridge =

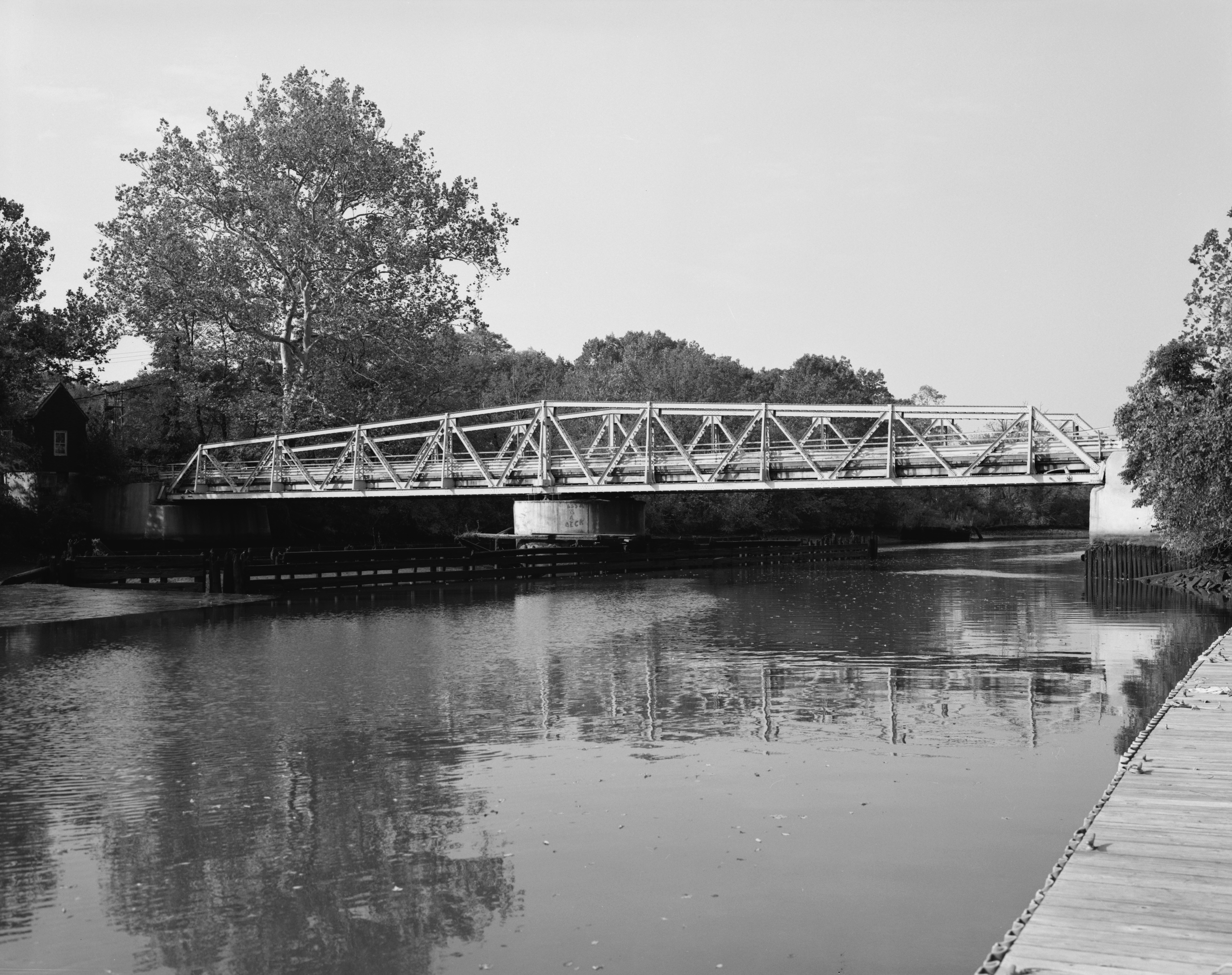
- The previous Locke Avenue Bridge, in 1996.
- Coordinates: 39°45′19″N 75°19′00″W
- Carries: CR 671 (Locke Avenue)
- Crosses: Raccoon Creek
- Locale: Swedesboro, New Jersey
- Official name: State Bridge No. 805D04
- Owner: Gloucester County

Characteristics
- Design: Swing bridge
- Material: Steel
- Total length: 154 feet 6 inches (47.09 m)
- Width: 15 feet 3 inches (4.65 m)
- Height: 17 feet 6 inches (5.33 m)
- No. of spans: 2
- Piers in water: 1
- Load limit: 5 short tons (4.5 t)
- Clearance below: 5 feet 8 inches (1.73 m)

History
- Engineering design by: William C. Cattell
- Constructed by: Owego Bridge Company
- Opened: 1911
- Closed: 2002

Location
- Interactive map of Locke Avenue Bridge

References
- Hunt, Rebecca A. (Fall 1996). "Locke Avenue Bridge" (PDF). Historic American Engineering Record. Washington, D.C.: Library of Congress. p. 1.

Locke Avenue Bridge is located on Locke Avenue (County Route 671), a two-lane rural route located at the northwest corner of Swedesboro in Gloucester County, New Jersey. This roadway runs generally north-south, connecting Auburn Road (County Route 551) with U.S. Route 322. The posted speed limit on Locke Avenue is 40 miles per hour (60 km/h).

== Previous bridge (1911–2002) ==
The Locke Avenue Bridge was eligible for inclusion in the National Record of Historic Places. A Historic Bridge Alternatives Analysis dated June 1995 was prepared by Bettigole Andrews and Clark, Inc., and recommended to replace the swing bridge with a fixed bridge. The recommended alternative was accepted by the New Jersey State Historic Preservation Office of the New Jersey Department of Environmental Protection and the Advisory Council on Historic Preservation. As requirements of the Memorandum of Agreement from the Advisory Council on Historic Preservation, preparation of Historic American Engineering Record (HAER) documentation of the bridge and a historic brochure were prepared. The purpose of the HAER documentation and the brochure are to provide written and photographic documentation of the history of commerce on the Raccoon Creek as it relates to the Locke Avenue Bridge and the history and physical operation of this type of movable bridge as located in this type of setting.

The swing bridge on Locke Avenue over the Raccoon Creek was 154 feet 6 inches (47.09 m) long. It was a single-lane, center pivot swing bridge that carried vehicular traffic over Raccoon Creek. The swing span was designed to manually rotate at its center pivot pier, which allowed marine traffic to pass underneath. It was constructed in 1911. The swing span had been locked in the closed position since 1971. The main channel of the Raccoon Creek was under the northern span of the bridge and has not been dredged since April 1965.

The swing span was supported by pony trusses. The trusses were 17 feet 6 inches (5.33 m) high, measured between centers of top and bottom truss chords. Also, the clear roadway width was 15 feet 3 inches (4.65 m), measured between two guide rails. There were no shoulders or sidewalks on the bridge and the overall width of the structure was 18 feet 7 inches (5.66 m). The bridge deck was constructed of timber planks with a 6-by-6-inch (15 by 15 cm) timber curb along both sides of the deck. The vertical clearance above the bridge deck was unlimited and unrestricted. The posted load capacity on the bridge was 5 short tons (4.5 t).

== Reason for replacement ==
Overall condition of the bridge was poor due to increasing deterioration of the superstructure and substructure, which resulted in the posted load limit. It was functionally outdated because the deck geometry provided a one-lane roadway for two-way traffic. The steel roadway stringers, floor beams, and trusses were corroded. It also had severe deterioration of the truss connection plates, and loss of bearing beneath the trusses and the bearing blocks at the pivot pier. Also, the northern and southern approach roadways reduced in width to a single lane upon approaching the bridge. Both northern and southern roadway approaches to the bridge sat on a sag profile that created sight distance issues for drivers.

== Current bridge ==
The swing bridge was replaced with a girder bridge in 2002. An environmental permit was issued to Hatch Mott MacDonald by New Jersey Department of Transportation to replace the swing bridge.

== See also ==
- List of bridges documented by the Historic American Engineering Record in New Jersey
