= Cranford (CDP), New Jersey =

Populated place in Union County, New Jersey, US

Cranford, New Jersey
- Census-designated place
- Location in Union County Location in New Jersey Location in the United States
- Coordinates: 40°39′23″N 74°18′13″W
- Country: United States
- State: New Jersey
- County: Union
- Township: Cranford

Area
  - Total: 0.34 sq mi (0.88 km^{2})
  - Land: 0.34 sq mi (0.87 km^{2})
  - Water: 0.0039 sq mi (0.01 km^{2})
- Elevation: 69 ft (21 m)

Population (2020)
  - Total: 2,032
  - Density: 6,032.9/sq mi (2,329.31/km^{2})
- Time zone: UTC−05:00 (Eastern (EST))
  - Summer (DST): UTC−04:00 (EDT)
- ZIP Code: 07016
- Area code: 908
- FIPS code: 34-15638
- GNIS feature ID: 2389371

Cranford is a census-designated place (CDP) comprising the downtown part of Cranford Township, Union County, in the U.S. state of New Jersey. It was first listed as a CDP prior to the 2020 census with a population of population was 2,032.

The CDP is bordered by Lincoln Avenue to the south and southwest, by the borough of Garwood to the west, by an unnamed stream and the Rahway River to the north and northeast, by Centennial Avenue to the east, and by Lincoln Park to the southeast. New Jersey Route 28 (North Avenue) runs through the center of downtown, as does the NJ Transit Raritan Valley Line, with access at Cranford station. Elizabeth is 5 miles (8 km) to the east, and Plainfield is 6 miles (10 km) to the southwest.

== Demographics ==
Historical population
Census	Pop.	Note	%±
2020	2,032		—
U.S. Decennial Census; 2020

Cranford first appeared as a census designated place in the 2020 U.S. census.

=== 2020 census ===
Cranford CDP, New Jersey – Racial and ethnic composition Note: the US Census treats Hispanic/Latino as an ethnic category. This table excludes Latinos from the racial categories and assigns them to a separate category. Hispanics/Latinos may be of any race.
Race / Ethnicity (NH = Non-Hispanic)	Pop 2020	% 2020
White alone (NH)	1,514	74.51%
Black or African American alone (NH)	92	4.53%
Native American or Alaska Native alone (NH)	3	0.15%
Asian alone (NH)	95	4.68%
Native Hawaiian or Pacific Islander alone (NH)	0	0.00%
Other Race alone (NH)	15	0.74%
Mixed race or Multiracial (NH)	68	3.35%
Hispanic or Latino (any race)	245	12.06%
Total	2,032	100.00%
