= Dreyer Farms =

Farm in Cranford, New Jersey, US

Coordinates: 40.665334°N 74.317287°W

Dreyer Farms is a produce farm in Cranford, New Jersey. It was the winner of Edible Communities' New Jersey Farm local hero award in 2008.

== History ==
The farm was started in 1904 by Gustav Dreyer and Henry Dreyer when they purchased adjacent farms on Springfield Avenue in Cranford, New Jersey.

In 2018, a solar panel system was installed on the farm's barn and store.
