= Karen Hummer =

American judo competitor

Personal information
- Born: February 25, 1962 (age 64) New Jersey, USA
- Weight: 48 kg (106 lb)

Sport
- Country: United States
- Sport: Judo
Medal record
Youngest person to win the AAU USA National Senior Champions

Karen Hummer (born February 25, 1962), from Cranford, New Jersey, is a former competitor in Judo and a US National Champion.

== Early life ==
Hummer began judo as a child when her father was a judo instructor at the Judo and Karate Center in Cranford, New Jersey. At age 12, as a third degree brown belt, she competed in the US National Championship in Judo. She defeated four opponents to earn a win.

== Career ==
Prior to competing at the National Championship, Hummer earned wins at various state tournaments including one held at Trenton State College. She trained out of New Jersey under judo instructor and two time U.S. Olympic Judo Team coach Yoshisada Yonezuka.

In 1974, she was the youngest competitor in the Senior USA AAU Nationals at Arizona and the youngest person to ever win the AAU USA National Senior Champions.

Hummer is believed to be the youngest national championship winner at the age in Judo history.
