= September 12th (film) =

Film

September 12th is an independent film, written and directed by John Touhey. Set on the third anniversary of the September 11 attacks, the film centers on the long-term effects the event had on many Americans.

The movie was filmed in several locations in the New York City boroughs of Manhattan, Brooklyn and Staten Island, as well as East Meadow, New York, Brooklyn, New York and Cranford, New Jersey.

== Awards ==
- Best Feature - Long Island Film Festival
- Best Feature - Longbaugh Film Festival

== Cast ==
- Joe Iacovino - Frank
- James Garrett - Rick
- Ernest Mingione - Eddie
- Kim Strouse - Monique
