= Deborah Wolfe =

American educator and minister (1916–2024)

Deborah Cannon Partridge Wolfe
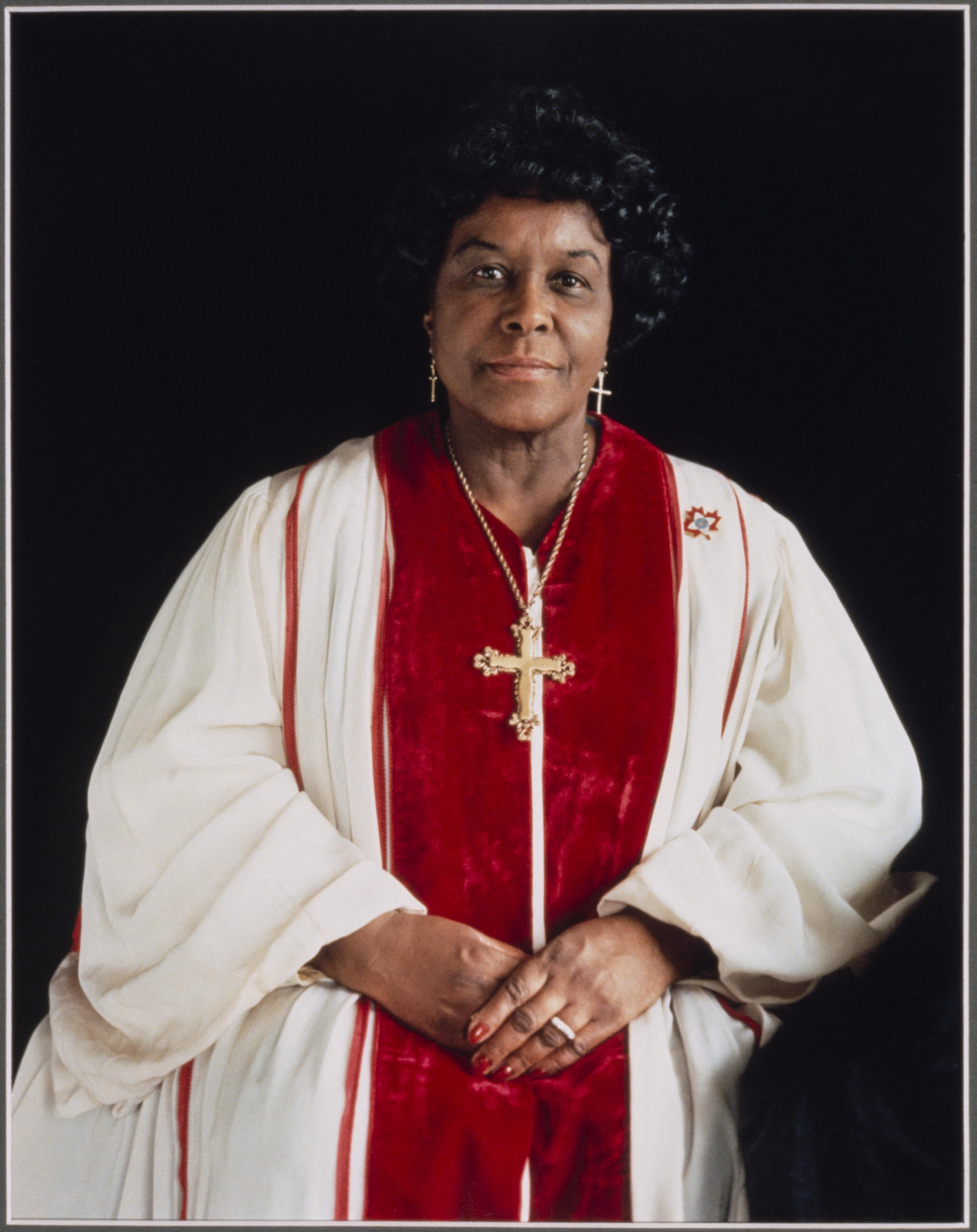
- Born: Olive Deborah Juanita Cannon; December 22, 1916; Cranford, New Jersey
- Died: September 3, 2004 (aged 87)
- Education: New Jersey City University; Columbia University
- Occupations: Minister; Educator; Education Chief of the United States House of Representatives Committee on Education and Labor
- Employer(s): Tuskegee University; University of Pennsylvania; Queens College; First Baptist Church of Cranford, New Jersey

Deborah Cannon Partridge Wolfe (December 22, 1916 — September 3, 2004) was an African American educator, minister, and Education Chief of the United States House of Representatives Committee on Education and Labor. Humbly self-described as a "teacher and preacher", Wolfe was a woman of many accomplishments in her field, an education reformer, and a pioneer who challenged racial and gender barriers.

== Early life ==
Wolfe was born Olive Deborah Juanita Cannon on December 22, 1916. Her parents were Reverend David Wadsworth and Gertrude Moody Cannon of Cranford, New Jersey. Reverend David Wadsworth Cannon was educated at Lincoln University and Princeton Theological Seminary, and was the pastor of the First Baptist Church of Cranford, New Jersey. He was also a chaplain during World War I, and as the result of a serious injury during the war, when he returned to New Jersey he could no longer preach. From that point on, Mrs. Cannon acted as the head of the family. Mrs. Cannon herself also held a degree, from the Evangel Theological Seminary, and worked as a teacher, social worker, lecturer, and activist for the Women's Christian Temperance Union and for women's suffrage. Wolfe remembered her parents wanting her to learn understanding and respect for herself, her heritage, and for other people, and the emphasis her parents placed on education's role in changing people's prejudices.

Wolfe attended Cranford public schools, which was an integrated school system, but was nevertheless a place where she experienced racial prejudice. She participated in many extracurriculars at Cranford High School, including the National Honor Society, history club, tennis, and basketball, and she excelled academically.

== Education ==
Wolfe held three advanced degrees, a B.S from New Jersey City University, and an M.S. and a PhD from Columbia University.

=== New Jersey City University ===
Wolfe dreamed of attending Oberlin College due to its liberal reputation and its longstanding acceptance of women and African Americans, but in 1929 the Great Depression began and the options for her pursuit of higher education became financially limited. She instead began commuting to New Jersey State Teachers College at New Jersey City University, which had a manageable tuition of one hundred dollars per year. She graduated in 1937 with her B.S. in Social Studies Education. While studying at New Jersey State Teachers College, Wolfe took on two internships and her teaching career thus began with teaching elementary age school children.

Wolfe worked many jobs to earn money for her commute to school, which she made by train, her tuition, and her books. She taught piano, tutored her fellow students, worked in the cafeteria, and did secretarial work for her professors. Wolfe worked one summer setting up educational and recreational programs for the children of migrant laborers in Maryland. She credits this experience as the inspiration for much of her later work in the field of Rural Education. She spent another summer as a Lisle Fellow for world peace. During the final two years of her undergraduate education, Wolfe was the principal of and a teacher at Cranford, New Jersey's adult night school, where she organized classes, conducted teacher meetings, taught courses, and fulfilled administrative duties. She would later credit this experience with her formulation of her administrative philosophy, which she described as democratically shared leadership. She graduated in 1937.

=== Columbia University ===
After receiving her undergraduate degree, Wolfe attended Columbia University's Teachers College. She received an M.S. in Rural Education there in 1938. While there, she learned under professors William Bagley and Florence Stratmeyer, both of whom were involved with the sorority Kappa Delta Pi, and they recommended her to membership, beginning her lifelong association with Kappa Delta Pi. She also studied under Professor Mabel Carney, and when she was finished with her master's degree in 1938, Carney recommended Wolfe to Dr. Frederick Douglas Patterson, the then president of the Tuskegee Institute. Wolfe began working at the Tuskegee Institute the same year that she graduated with her master's degree as a principal and teacher-trainer in the rural laboratory schools that were part of the institute. Wolfe would later return to Columbia University's Teachers College and graduate with her Ph.D. in 1945. Her doctoral dissertation was entitled A Plan for Redesigning the Curriculum of the Rural Laboratory Schools of the Tuskegee Institute.

== Career in education ==
Wolfe served on the faculty of the Tuskegee Institute from 1938 to 1950. During that time, she was not only a principal, but the head of the institute's Department of Elementary Education and the Director of the Graduate Studies Program. In her role as Director of the Graduate Studies Program, Wolfe trained teachers to instruct other teachers in rural schools and to supervise schools, and she required them to complete a Master's Thesis, a rigorous requirement compared to other, similar programs.

While working at the Tuskegee Institute, Wolfe continued to pursue her education, and attended a summer session at Vassar College via scholarship in 1944. While there, Wolfe met First Lady Eleanor Roosevelt during a discussion group, and was inspired by the First Lady, who she felt "really cared about all the people and made it abundantly clear that she was not prejudiced."

In 1950, Wolfe left the Tuskegee Institute and spent several years associated with numerous institutions and organizations. That year she worked at the University of Pennsylvania and studied research methods and statistical analysis, was appointed Professor of Education at Queens College, and began work as a Postdoctoral Scholar at Union Theological Seminary. She began lecturing at colleges and universities across the country as a visiting professor. Wolfe was the first African American professor at Queens College when she was appointed in 1950. She was tenured in 1954. While in that position, Wolfe also served as a chairperson for the admissions committee, coordinator of the campus laboratory school, and director of the African Study Abroad program. She stayed at Queens College until 1962 when she left to work as Education Chief of the Committee on Education and Labor in the United States House of Representatives. Notably, at the same time, Wolfe was pursuing religious studies; from 1952 to 1953 she continued the work she had begun at the Union Theological Seminary, this time at the Jewish Theological Seminary of America.

During her tenure as Education Chief, she worked under the Kennedy Administration to pass innovative and comprehensive education legislation. The work that she did in that position originated Head Start, financial aid, community colleges, and modernized vocational education. Her role was to coordinate all matters related to education coming before the committee, to educate members about the bills, and to liaise between the House of Representatives and the Department of Health, Education and Welfare on education issues. During this time, Wolfe helped pass into law the Economic Opportunity Act, also known as the War on Poverty, the Higher Education Facilities Act of 1963, and the Elementary and Secondary Education Act of 1965.

Wolfe stayed in her position as Education Chief until 1965. At that time, her son was graduating from high school in Cranford, New Jersey, and she felt that he needed her. She returned to New Jersey and resumed her work at Queens College, involving herself in many committees and school groups, including sponsoring the Kappa Delta Pi chapter there and participating in the International Honor Society in Education.

== Retirement and personal life ==
By the time Wolfe retired from Queens College, she had been married twice; first in 1940 to Henry Roy Partridge, a specialist in agricultural and commercial dietetics whom she had met at the Tuskegee Institute, and then to Alvis Wolfe, a business executive, in 1959. Her marriage to Mr. Wolfe ended in 1966.

In the early 1960s, Wolfe also played an active role in the civil rights movement, and had in fact advocated for the rights of African Americans throughout her career. In her retirement from her career as an educator, Wolfe was still very involved in a number of civil rights and advocacy groups, including a membership in the NAACP, her vice presidency of the National Council for Negro Women, and her position as the Grand-Basileus of the African American sorority Zeta Phi Beta. She participated in the famous march down Constitution Avenue, and was seated two rows behind Martin Luther King Jr. when he made his famous speech, "I Have a Dream."

In 1970, Wolfe was the first African American woman ordained by the American Baptist Church, and beginning in 1975, Wolfe served as the associate minister at the very same First Baptist Church of Cranford, New Jersey where her father had served before her.

She remained involved with many organizations, and was the president of the National Alliance for Black School Educators, member of the Advanced Education Committee for the Graduate Record Examination, education area representative for the American Association of University Women, and was the first African American Woman fellow of the Commission on Science Education for the American Association for the Advancement of Science. She was the Vice President of the National Alliance for Safer Cities, an official non-governmental organization represented at the United Nations, and was the first person to serve on both the New Jersey State Board of Education and the New Jersey State Board of Higher Education simultaneously. She was the only African American member on the Seton Hall University Board of Regents, and served on the advisory board to the Schlesinger Library at Radcliffe College. While involved with Radcliffe College, she was on the Advisory Committee to the Black Women Oral History Project, and was interviewed herself as part of that project.

== Death and legacy ==
Deborah Cannon Partridge Wolfe died on September 3, 2004. She has been awarded twenty-six honorary doctorate degrees, and is honored by a number of educational institutions who have named buildings in her honor, including a High School at the Tuskegee Institute, a building at Trenton State College, and Cranford High School, where she herself attended. Her papers are held by Schlesinger Library in Cambridge, Massachusetts.

== External links and further reading ==
- Black Women Oral History Project. Interviews, 1976-1981. Deborah Wolfe. OH-31. Schlesinger Library, Radcliffe Institute, Harvard University, Cambridge, Mass.
- Wolfe, D. (1965). What the Economic Opportunity Act Means to the Negro. The Journal of Negro Education, 34(1), 88–92. doi:10.2307/2294300
- Dr. Deborah Cannon Partridge Wolfe Scholarship. (2020). Application for 2020 Scholarship Award. Zeta Phi Beta Sorority. Cambridge, MA.
- Van Hover, Stephanie. (2001). Deborah Partridge Wolfe's Contributions to Social Education. Doctoral Dissertation, University of Florida.
