= Cranford, New Jersey =

Township in Union County, New Jersey, US

- Township
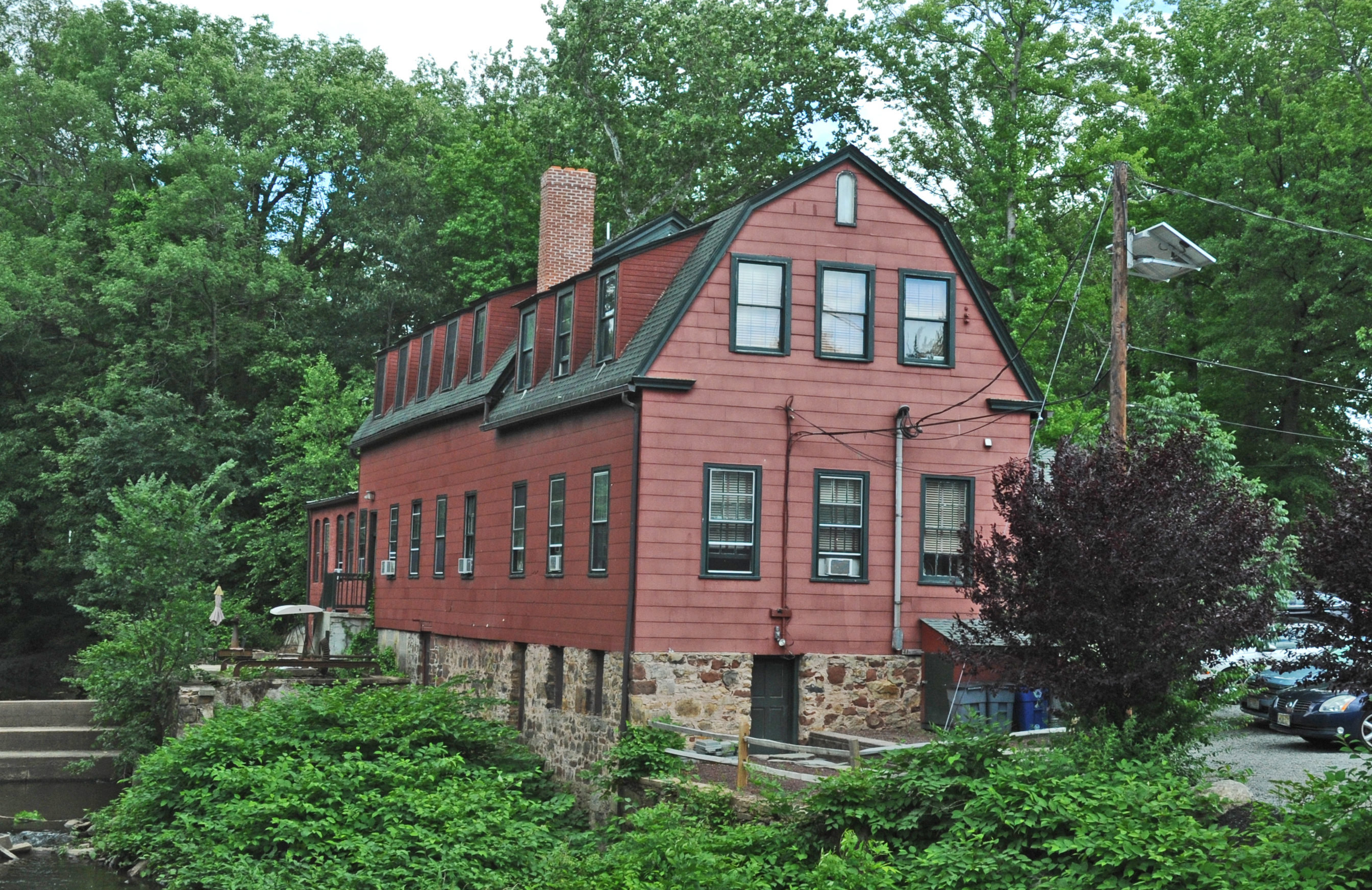
- Droeschers Mill, built in 1737 on the Rahway River

- Seal
- Nickname: "The Venice of New Jersey"
- Motto: "Friendship and Progress"
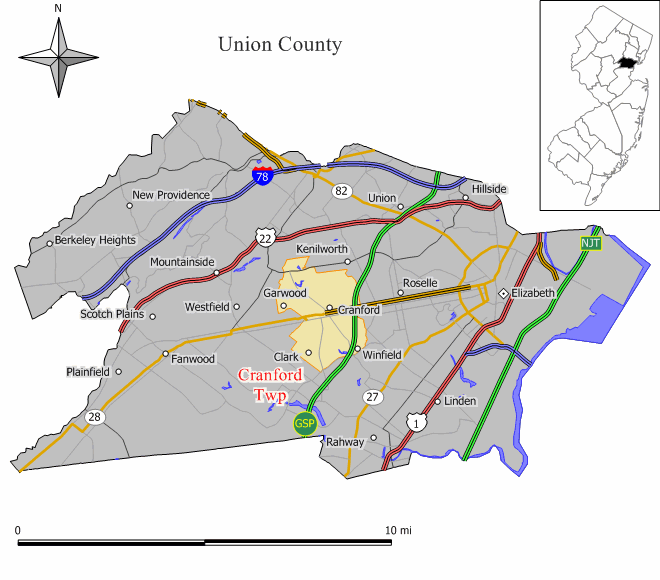
- Location of Cranford in Union County highlighted in yellow (left). Inset map: Location of Union County in New Jersey highlighted in black (right).

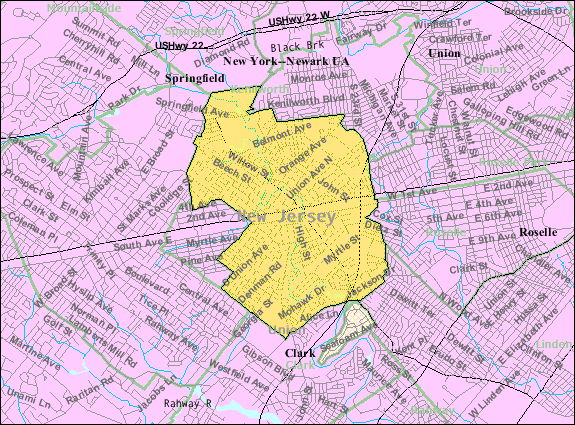
- Census Bureau map of Cranford, New Jersey

- Location in Union County Location in New Jersey Location in the United States
- Coordinates: 40.656391°N 74.30483°W
- Country: United States
- State: New Jersey
- County: Union
- Incorporated: March 14, 1871

Government
  - Type: Township
  - Body: Township Committee
  - Mayor: Kathleen Miller Prunty (D, term ends December 31, 2026)
  - Administrator: Lavona Patterson (interim)
  - Municipal clerk: Patricia Donahue

Area
  - Total: 4.87 sq mi (12.62 km^{2})
  - Land: 4.83 sq mi (12.52 km^{2})
  - Water: 0.039 sq mi (0.10 km^{2}) 0.78%
  - Rank: 281st of 565 in state 10th of 21 in county
- Elevation: 82 ft (25 m)

Population (2020)
  - Total: 23,847
  - Estimate (2023): 23,741
  - Rank: 112th of 565 in state 8th of 21 in county
  - Density: 4,927.1/sq mi (1,902.4/km^{2})
  - Rank: 115th of 565 in state 11th of 21 in county
- Time zone: UTC−05:00 (Eastern (EST))
  - Summer (DST): UTC−04:00 (Eastern (EDT))
- ZIP Code: 07016
- Area code: 908
- FIPS code: 3403915640
- GNIS feature ID: 0882214
- Website: www.cranfordnj.org

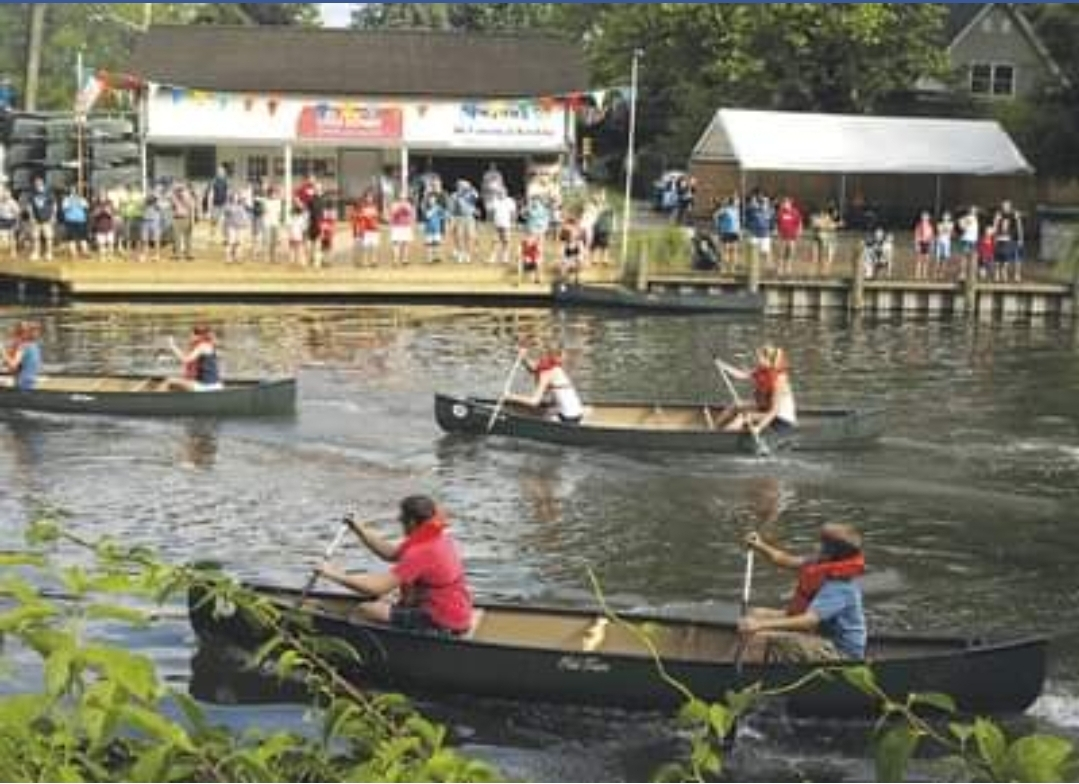
Paddlers race past the Cranford Canoe Club on the Rahway River during the annual Fourth of July competition in Cranford.

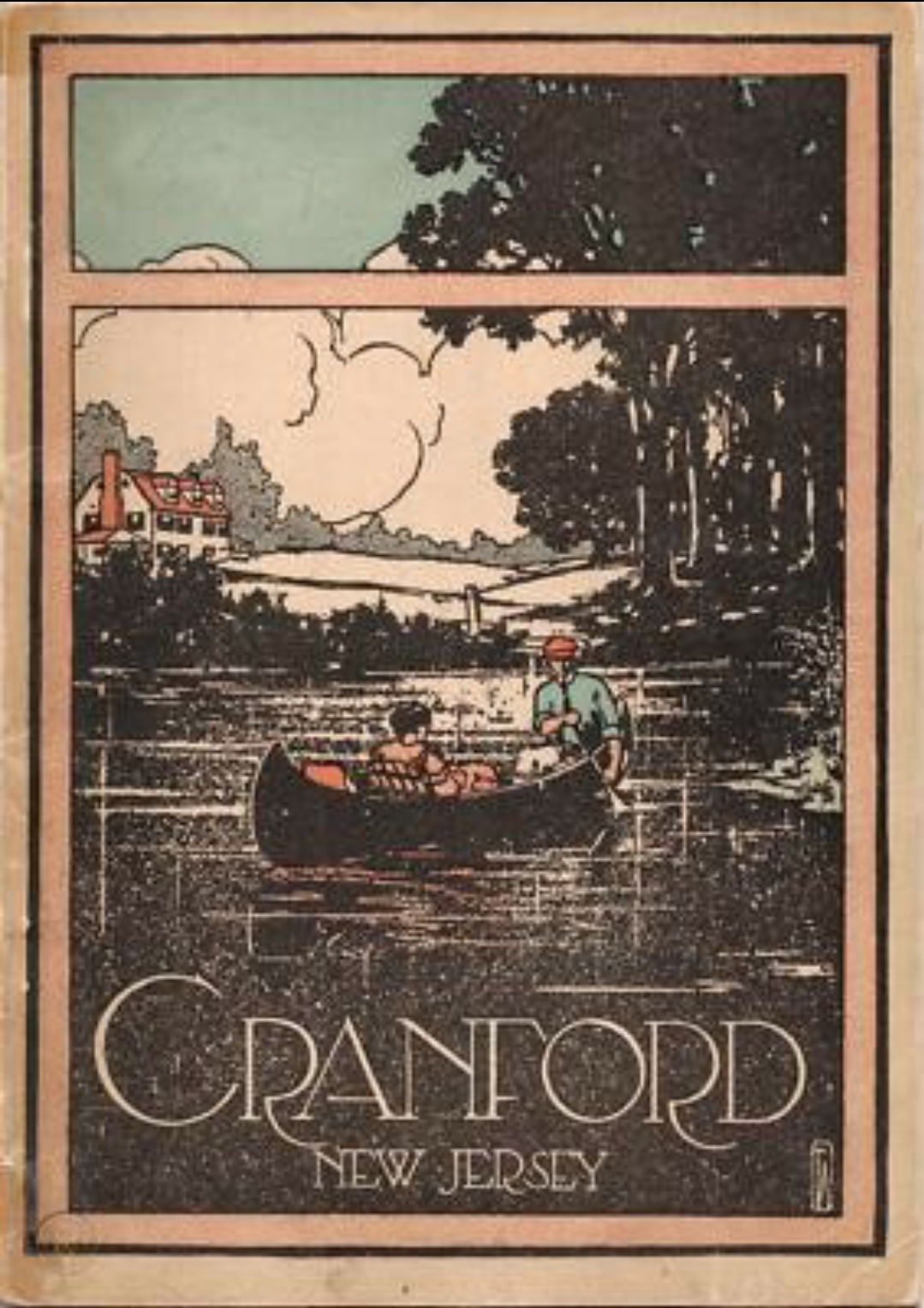
Cranford as depicted on a 1913 Board of Trade brochure

Cranford is a township in Union County, in the U.S. state of New Jersey, located 18 miles (29 km) southwest of New York City. As of the 2020 United States census, the township's population was 23,847, an increase of 1,222 (+5.4%) from the 2010 census count of 22,625, which in turn reflected an increase of 47 (+0.2%) from the 22,578 counted in the 2000 census.

NJ Transit rail service is available at the Cranford station, along the Raritan Valley Line, with service to Newark Penn Station and to New York Penn Station in via Midtown Direct. It is part of the New York metropolitan area.

Cranford was incorporated as a township by an act of the New Jersey Legislature on March 14, 1871, from portions of the Townships of Clark, Linden, Springfield Township, Union Township and Westfield. Portions of the township were taken to form Garwood (in 1903) and Kenilworth (in 1907). The township's name is said to derive from the Crane family, including John Crane, who built a mill in 1720 along the Rahway River.

== Historic preservation ==
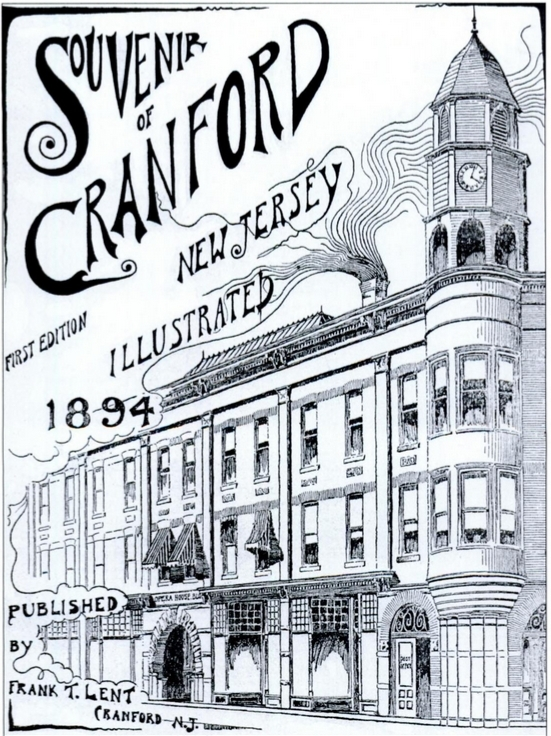
The cover of Souvenir of Cranford (1894) by architect Frank T. Lent

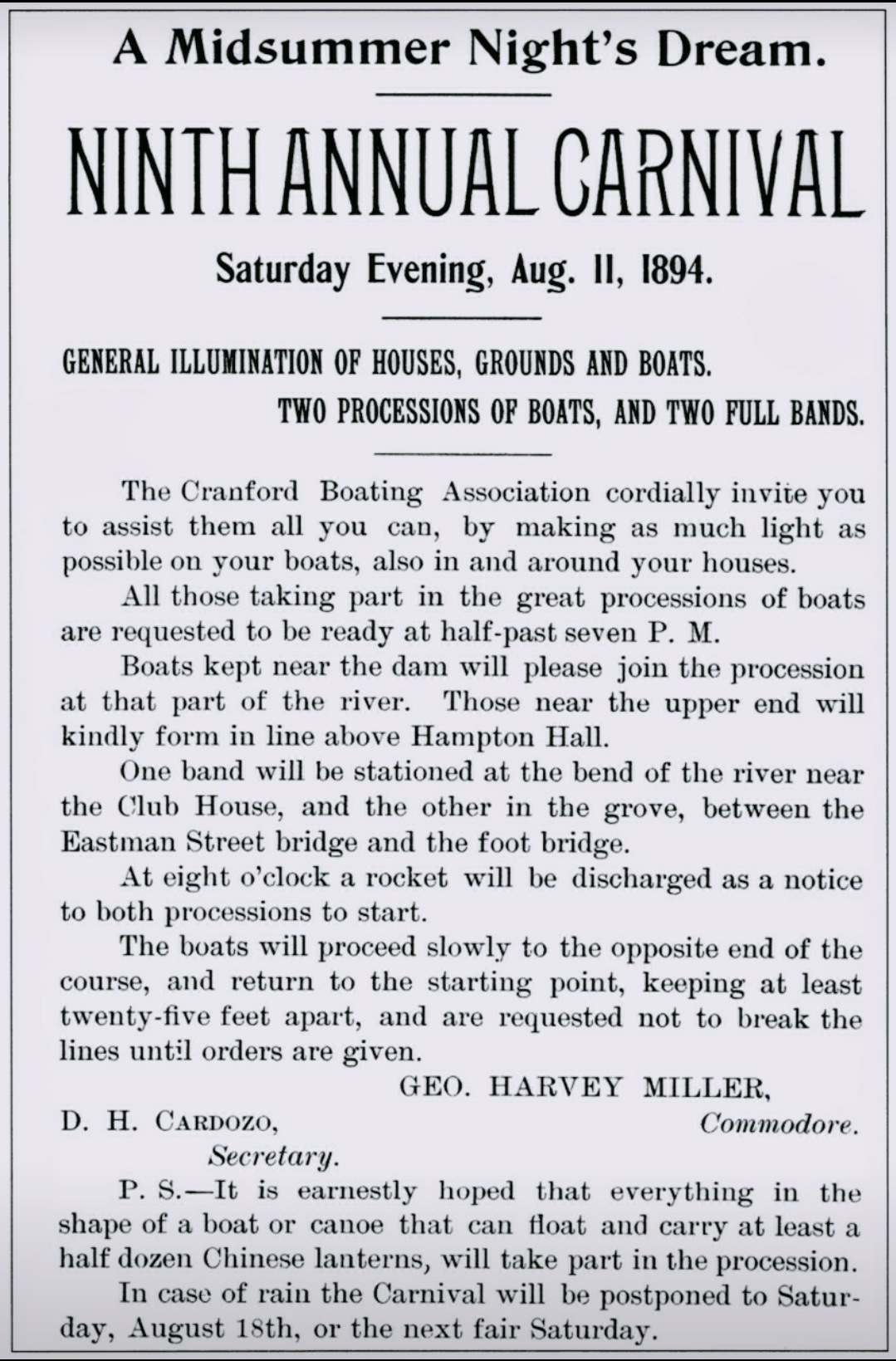
1894 river carnival announcement by the Cranford Boating Association

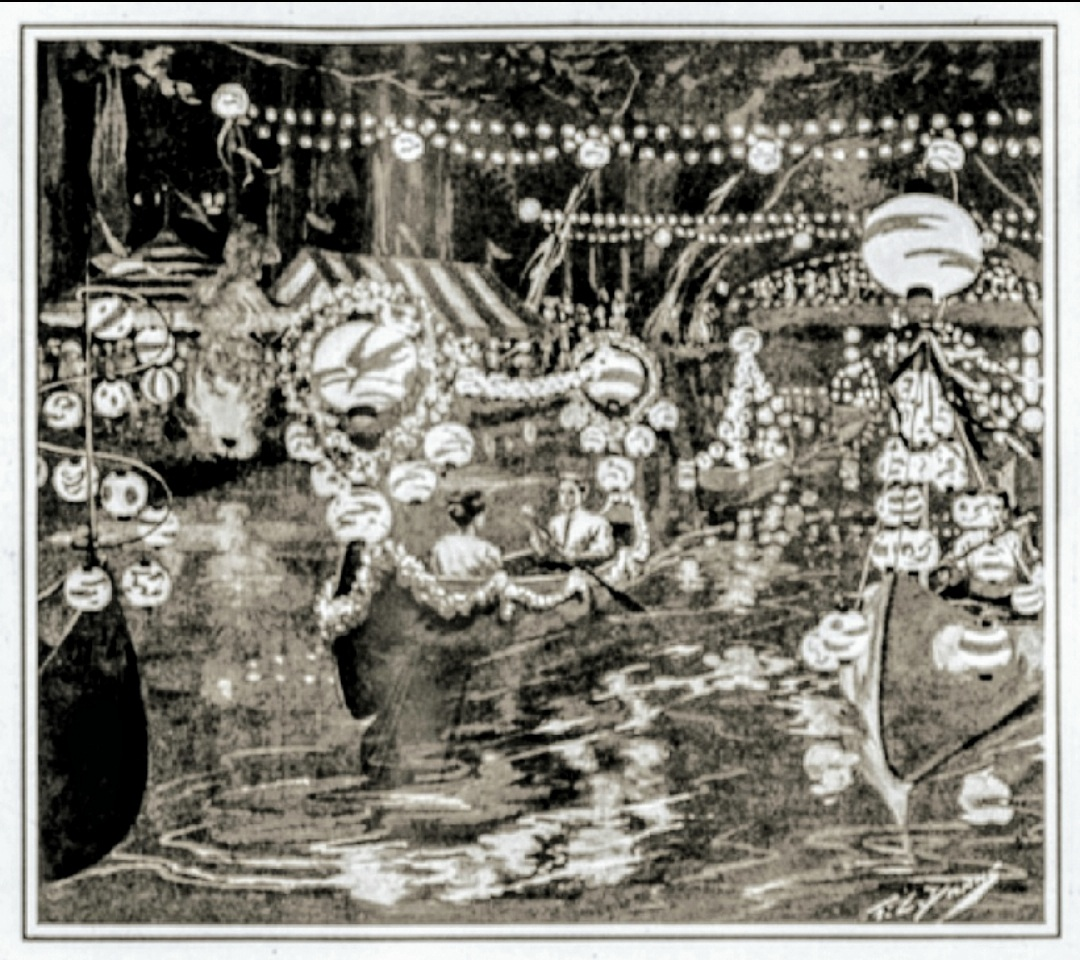
Illustration of Cranford's lantern-lit river carnival in a 1908 edition of Harper's Weekly

Historic sites in the township are overseen by the Cranford Historic Preservation Advisory Board.

The Cranford Historical Society, a private entity founded in 1927 and located in Hanson Park on Springfield Avenue, maintains the Crane-Phillips House (c. 1845), located at 124 North Union Avenue, as a museum.

=== Historic figures ===
Though no known Cranford residents died in the American Civil War, at least 22 were active in the Union Army at the time of General Robert E. Lee's surrender. Cranford's last surviving Civil War veteran died in 1935.

James E. Warner is a former sheriff of Union County who was the namesake of the James E. Warner Plaza at the Cranford Train Station. Concerned by the then-growing pollution of the Rahway given the cleaner waters of his youth, Warner advocated for the preservation of the Rahway River and Rahway River Parkway parkland. One of Sheriff Warner's successful targets in fighting Rahway River pollution was his battle against the discharge of paper makers; one such site is now the regional theater known as the Paper Mill Playhouse in Millburn. The Cranford Canoe Club, built in 1908, continues to offer canoes and kayaks for rent on the river in town.

Charles Hansel was co-founder of the Union County Parks Commission that preserved parkland all along the Rahway River and its tributaries in the 1920s, a greenway now known as the Rahway River Parkway. He was an engineer for the Pennsylvania Railroad and Central Railroad of New Jersey. Hansel lived in the 300 block of North Union Avenue in a home that still stands today, later moving to what is now Gray's Funeral Home, near what is now called Hansel's Dam by Sperry Park. For his Rahway River preservation efforts, a memorial copper plaque was placed to Hansel in Echo Lake Park.

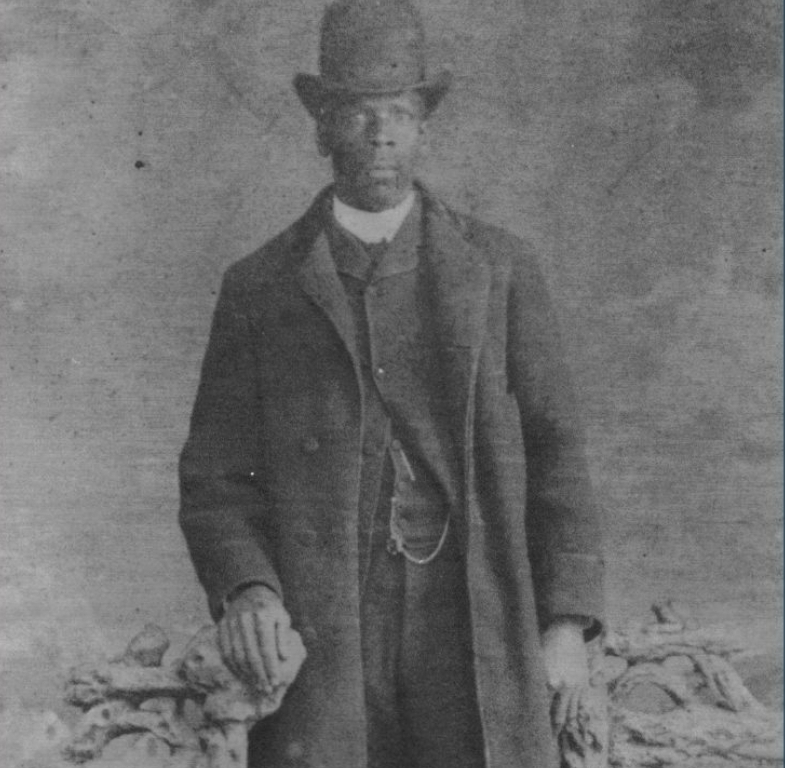
Joshua Bryant (1852–1898) was Cranford's first Black law enforcement officer, the township's first Black elected official, and an influential figure in local politics. He was born in Virginia during slavery and moved to Cranford. Bryant is buried locally in Fairview Cemetery & Arboretum.

Joshua Bryant was Cranford's first Black law enforcement officer and the township's first Black elected official.

William P. Westervelt was credited with thwarting the Baltimore Plot, an unsuccessful assassination attempt against president-elect Abraham Lincoln. He did so by cutting telegraph wires that would have alerted assassins to Lincoln's arrival.

== Geography ==
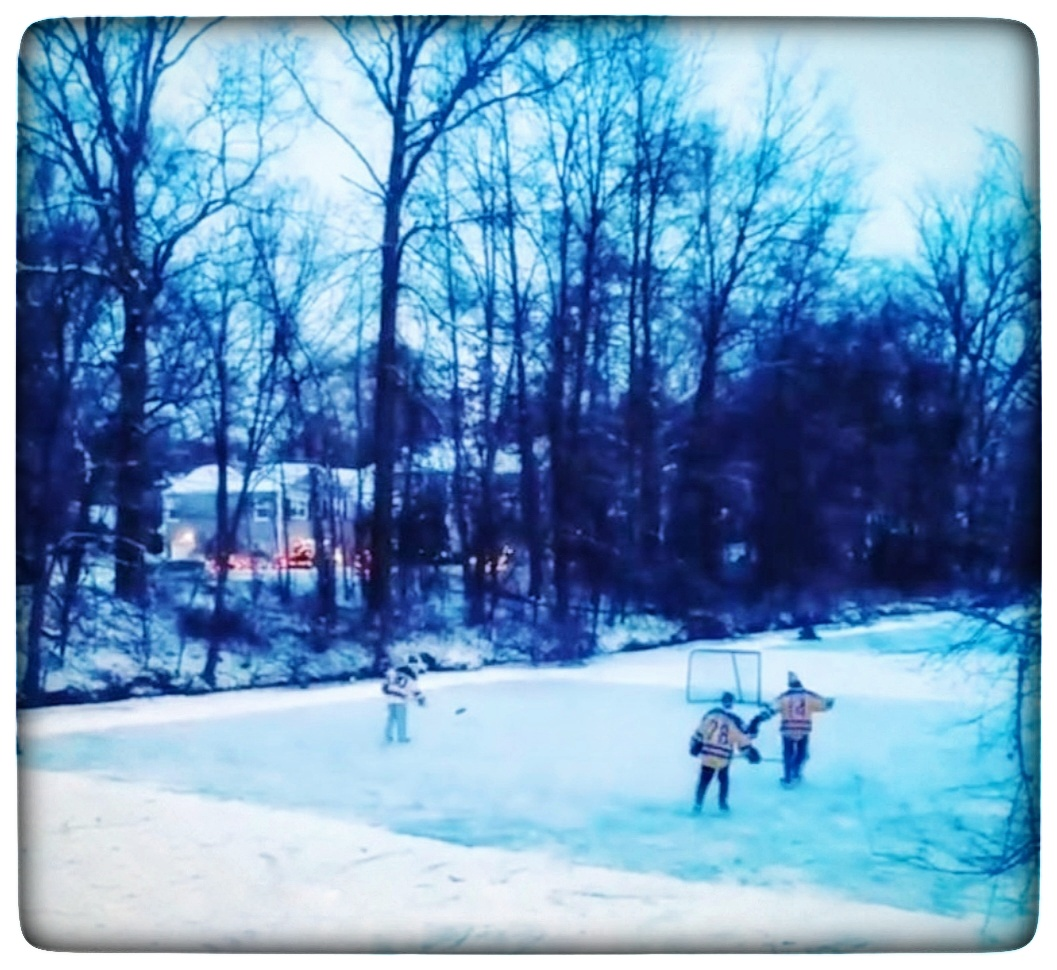
Ice hockey on the Rahway River in 2017, north of Nomahegan Park in Cranford.

According to the United States Census Bureau, the township had a total area of 4.87 square miles (12.6 km^{2}), including 4.84 square miles (12.5 km^{2}) of land and 0.04 square miles (0.10 km^{2}) of water (0.78%). Cranford's downtown is as a census-designated place.

There are nine municipalities bordering the township: Garwood and Westfield to the west, Springfield to the north, Kenilworth to the northeast, Roselle and Roselle Park to the east, Linden to the southeast, Winfield Township and Clark to the south.

== Parks ==
=== Township parks ===
Parks run by the township and overseen by the Cranford Recreation and Parks Department include:

- Adams Park – Adams Avenue and Lambert Street. Morses Creek dips into Cranford behind this park.
- Buchanan Park – Centennial Avenue and Buchanan Avenue
- Cranford Canoe Club – Springfield Avenue and Orange Avenue The Cranford Canoe Club rents canoes and kayaks for trips on the Rahway River in Cranford. The current structure was built as a private canoe club in 1908.
- Community Center – Walnut Avenue. The Cranford Community Center, adjacent to the Cranford Public Library, offers classes, sports, speaker series and other recreational activities.
- Josiah Crane Park – Springfield Avenue and North Union Avenue. In 1971, the Cranford Historical Society marked the farm and village home of Josiah Crane Sr. (1791–1873) in a park across from the First Presbyterian Church on the Rahway River. This park now features Cranford's 9/11 Memorial.
- Cranford West – Hope, N.J. Originally the home of the Cranford Boys Club on Silver Lake from the 1920s to the 1960s
- Girl Scout Park – Springfield Avenue and Orange Avenue. This was once the site of a canoe club, later the Neva Sykes Girl Scout House, demolished in the 1950s.
- Hampton Park – Eastman Street and Hampton Street
- Hanson Park – Springfield Avenue and Holly Street. Home of the Hanson Park Conservancy.
- Johnson Park – Johnson Avenue. The Johnson Avenue playground opened in July 1957.
- Lincoln Park – Lincoln Avenue at South Union. What is now Lincoln Park was the Cranford Golf Club in 1899, now moved to Westfield and called the Echo Lake Country Club. The Lincoln Avenue grounds were designed by Willie Dunn. Lincoln Park was also originally a former estate said to have supplied lumber to build the USS Constitution ("Old Ironsides") in the 1700s. The grounds, at the corner of the Old York Road and Benjamin Street, also included the largest sour gum ever recorded in the Northeastern states, known as the Cranford Pepperidge Tree or "Old Peppy". The cultivated shoots from Old Peppy's root system now form a grove of saplings offering shade to the Deborah Cannon Partridge Wolfe Reading Garden in the park. The park has hosted bocce ball tournaments since the mid-1960s.
- Mayor's Park – Springfield Avenue and North Union Avenue
- Memorial Park – Springfield Avenue and Central Avenue, in 2014, the Cranford Historical Society dedicated a civil war monument.
- Roosevelt Park – Orange Avenue and Pacific Avenue
- Sherman Park – Lincoln Avenue East. Former site of Sherman School and located on the Old York Road.
- At the corner of Elizabeth and North Union Avenues sits a memorial bench dedicated to the Cranford Dixie Giants, the town's semiprofessional baseball team organized by and composed entirely of African-American players, which played in the early 1900s.

=== County parks ===
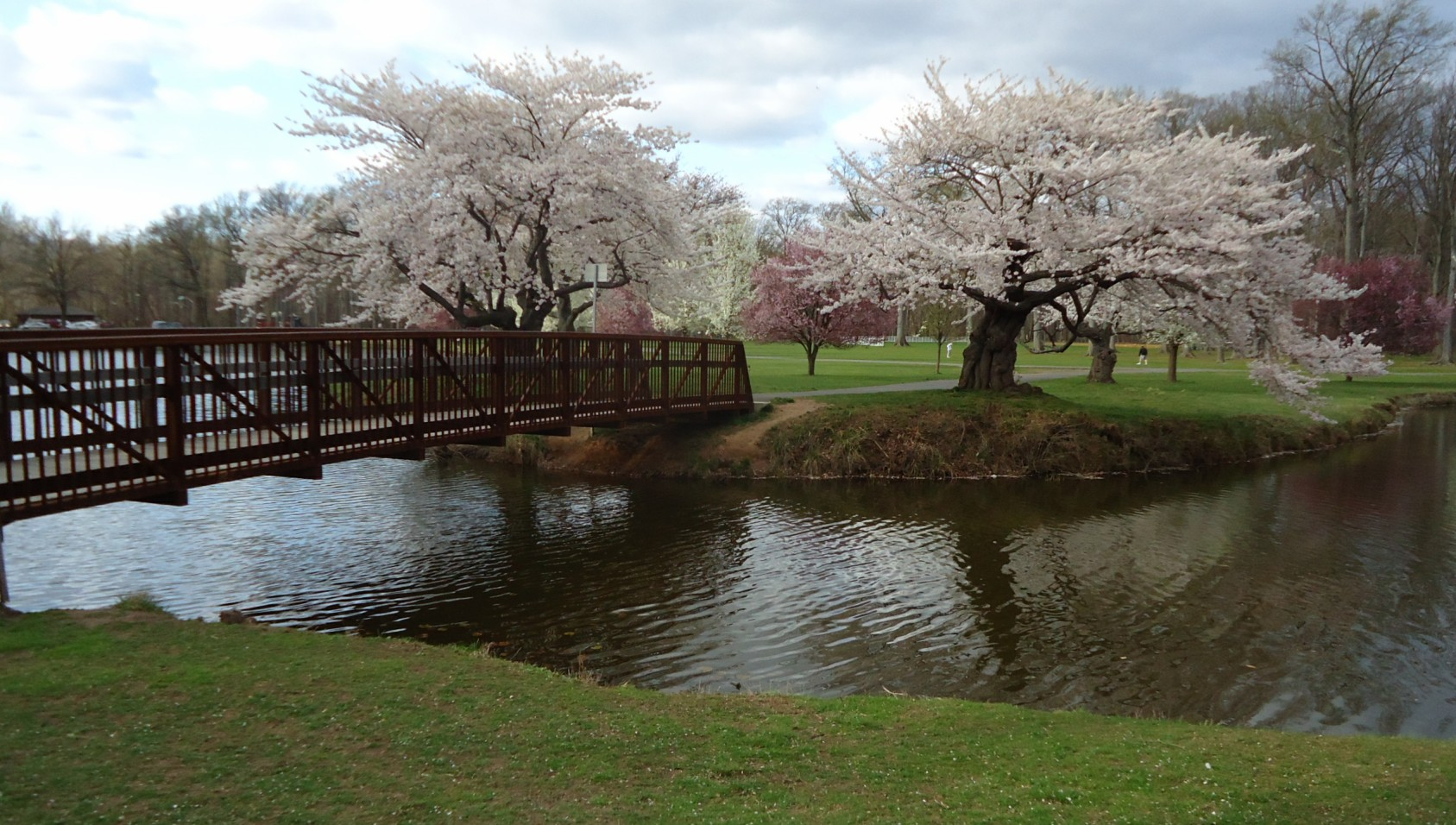
View around a lake in Nomahegan Park across from Union College

Parks run by the county inside Cranford's borders (overseen by the Union County, New Jersey Parks and Recreation Department) include:

- Lenape Park in Cranford, Kenilworth, Springfield, Union and Westfield. Two tusks from an ancient American mastodon were found in 1936 north of Kenilworth Boulevard in what is now Lenape Park (other sources name the swampy area directly behind what is now the parking lot of Union College's main building).
- MacConnell Park (formerly known as Liberty Park and frequently misspelled as "McConnell Park") is named after the township's first physician, Joseph Kerr MacConnell. It is located on Eastman Street and was known as the Peninsula during the Victorian era due to its position nearly encircled by the Rahway River.
- Nomahegan Park (off Springfield Avenue across from Union College) is named for a tributary of the Rahway River that runs through it, to Lenape Park to Echo Lake Park in Westfield and Springfield, called Nomahegan Brook. The name "Nomahegan" has had many different spellings in the historical sources (such as "Normahiggins") and may mean "she-wolf" or "women Mohegans." According to the Federal Writers' Project, The WPA Guide to New Jersey: The Garden State (1939):
  "CRANFORD is an old residential town spread along the Rahway River Parkway, a link of nearly 7 miles joining a series of county parks and playgrounds with the Essex County park system. There are facilities for summer and winter sports, a rifle range, and picnic grove. The Fourth of July canoe regatta is an annual affair. Gardens of fine old Victorian houses line the edge of the parkway on the riverbank. A broadening of the river parkway at the northern end of Cranford is known as Nomahegan Park. The name Nomahegan is a variation of Noluns Mohegans, as the New Jersey Indians were called in the treaty ending the Indian troubles in 1758. It is translated as women Mohegans or she-wolves and was applied to them in scorn by the fighting Iroquois.
  In 2019, the county purchased a long-abandoned house and demolished it, adding the land to the park's footprint.
- Droescher's Mill Park, located near the dam at Droescher's Mill on High Street. Also called Squire Williams Park.
- Mohawk Park is located on Mohawk Drive in Cranford's Indian Village section of town.
- Sperry Park (named after William Miller Sperry), located off North Union Avenue. Home of annual rubber duck derby as a fundraiser for Hanson Park further upstream on the Rahway River.
- Unami Park (located at Lexington and S. Union Avenue).

=== Rahway River Parkway – Cranford Section ===
The Rahway River Parkway is a greenway of parkland that hugs the Rahway River and its tributaries. It was designed in the 1920s by the Olmsted Brothers firm, who were the sons of the eminent landscape architect Frederick Law Olmsted. The Cranford section follows the banks of the meandering Rahway River as it flows south through Lenape Park, Nomahegan Park, Hampton Park, MacConnell Park, Hanson Park, Sperry Park, Crane's Park, Droescher's Mill Park, and Mohawk Park.

==== Cranford Riverwalk ====
The Cranford Riverwalk and Heritage Corridor portion of the Rahway River Parkway begins at the parklands near where Orange Avenue meets Springfield at the Cranford Canoe Club and follows the Rahway River on its path southbound to the Williams-Droescher Mill from the early 18th century. At Heritage Plaza at the southwest corner of South Avenue and Centennial, the century-old stone walls and iconic stone columns winding through woodland to Droescher's Mill are still in place, but are in need of restoration and preservation. Future plans include repairing the Kaltenbach Estate skating pond, the Victorian footbridge and Squire Williams Picnic Grove at Droescher's Mill Park.

== Demographics ==
Historical population
| Census | Pop. | Note | %± |
|---|---|---|---|
| 1880 | 1,184 | | — |
| 1890 | 1,717 | | 45.0% |
| 1900 | 2,854 | | 66.2% |
| 1910 | 3,641 | | 27.6% |
| 1920 | 6,001 | | 64.8% |
| 1930 | 11,126 | | 85.4% |
| 1940 | 12,860 | | 15.6% |
| 1950 | 18,602 | | 44.7% |
| 1960 | 26,424 | | 42.0% |
| 1970 | 27,391 | | 3.7% |
| 1980 | 24,573 | | −10.3% |
| 1990 | 22,633 | | −7.9% |
| 2000 | 22,578 | | −0.2% |
| 2010 | 22,625 | | 0.2% |
| 2020 | 23,847 | | 5.4% |
| 2023 (est.) | 23,741 | ▼ | −0.4% |
Population sources: 1880–1920 1880–1890; 1890–1910 1910–1930; 1940–2000 2000; 2010 2020

=== 2020 census ===
Cranford township, Union County, New Jersey – Racial and ethnic composition Note: the US Census treats Hispanic/Latino as an ethnic category. This table excludes Latinos from the racial categories and assigns them to a separate category. Hispanics/Latinos may be of any race.
| Race / Ethnicity (NH = Non-Hispanic) | Pop 2000 | Pop 2010 | Pop 2020 | % 2000 | % 2010 | % 2020 |
|---|---|---|---|---|---|---|
| White alone (NH) | 20,464 | 19,635 | 18,946 | 90.64% | 86.78% | 79.45% |
| Black or African American alone (NH) | 579 | 563 | 653 | 2.56% | 2.49% | 2.74% |
| Native American or Alaska Native alone (NH) | 5 | 10 | 6 | 0.02% | 0.04% | 0.03% |
| Asian alone (NH) | 484 | 635 | 903 | 2.14% | 2.81% | 3.79% |
| Native Hawaiian or Pacific Islander alone (NH) | 5 | 3 | 4 | 0.02% | 0.01% | 0.02% |
| Other race alone (NH) | 24 | 50 | 106 | 0.11% | 0.22% | 0.44% |
| Mixed race or Multiracial (NH) | 138 | 255 | 786 | 0.61% | 1.13% | 3.30% |
| Hispanic or Latino (any race) | 879 | 1,474 | 2,443 | 3.89% | 6.51% | 10.24% |
| Total | 22,578 | 22,625 | 23,847 | 100.00% | 100.00% | 100.00% |

=== 2010 census ===
The 2010 United States census counted 22,625 people, 8,583 households, and 6,154 families in the township. The population density was 4,684.6 per square mile (1,808.7/km^{2}). There were 8,816 housing units at an average density of 1,825.4 per square mile (704.8/km^{2}). The racial makeup was 91.85% (20,781) White, 2.62% (592) Black or African American, 0.08% (18) Native American, 2.84% (643) Asian, 0.02% (4) Pacific Islander, 1.03% (234) from other races, and 1.56% (353) from two or more races. Hispanic or Latino of any race were 6.51% (1,474) of the population.

Of the 8,583 households, 33.4% had children under the age of 18; 60.2% were married couples living together; 8.4% had a female householder with no husband present and 28.3% were non-families. Of all households, 24.8% were made up of individuals and 13.3% had someone living alone who was 65 years of age or older. The average household size was 2.61 and the average family size was 3.15.

24.2% of the population were under the age of 18, 5.8% from 18 to 24, 23.6% from 25 to 44, 29.3% from 45 to 64, and 17.2% who were 65 years of age or older. The median age was 42.8 years. For every 100 females, the population had 91.7 males. For every 100 females ages 18 and older there were 87.2 males.

The Census Bureau's 2006–2010 American Community Survey showed that (in 2010 inflation-adjusted dollars) median household income was $107,052 (with a margin of error of +/− $5,725) and the median family income was $128,534 (+/− $7,200). Males had a median income of $81,979 (+/− $7,672) versus $61,649 (+/− $4,965) for females. The per capita income for the township was $48,008 (+/− $2,581). About 2.1% of families and 3.3% of the population were below the poverty line, including 3.9% of those under age 18 and 8.5% of those age 65 or over.

=== 2000 census ===
As of the 2000 United States census there were 22,578 people, 8,397 households, and 6,222 families residing in the township. The population density was 4,684.2 people per square mile (1,808.6 people/km^{2}). There were 8,560 housing units at an average density of 1,775.9 per square mile (685.7/km^{2}). The racial makeup of the township was 93.70% White, 2.58% Black or African American, 0.04% Native American, 2.15% Asian, 0.02% Pacific Islander, 0.67% from other races, and 0.84% from two or more races. 3.89% of the population were Hispanic or Latino of any race.

There were 8,397 households, out of which 32.9% had children under the age of 18 living with them, 63.0% were married couples living together, 8.8% had a female householder with no husband present, and 25.9% were non-families. 21.9% of all households were made up of individuals, and 10.2% had someone living alone who was 65 years of age or older. The average household size was 2.62 and the average family size was 3.09.

In the township the population was spread out, with 23.3% under the age of 18, 5.3% from 18 to 24, 29.4% from 25 to 44, 24.1% from 45 to 64, and 17.9% who were 65 years of age or older. The median age was 40 years. For every 100 females, there were 90.5 males. For every 100 females age 18 and over, there were 86.2 males.

The median income for a household in the township was $76,338, and the median income for a family was $86,624. Males had a median income of $60,757 versus $41,020 for females. The per capita income for the township was $33,283. About 1.0% of families and 2.5% of the population were below the poverty line, including 1.5% of those under age 18 and 6.3% of those age 65 or over.

== Economy ==
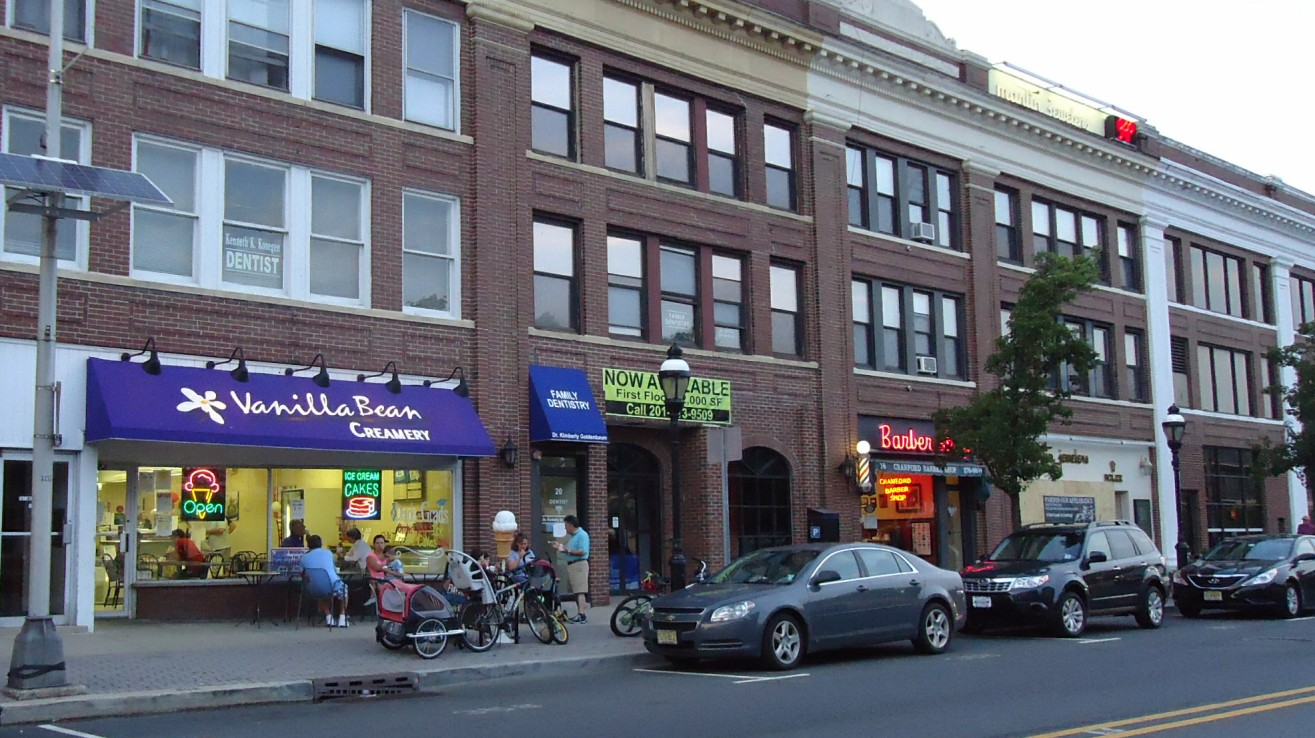
Stores in the downtown area

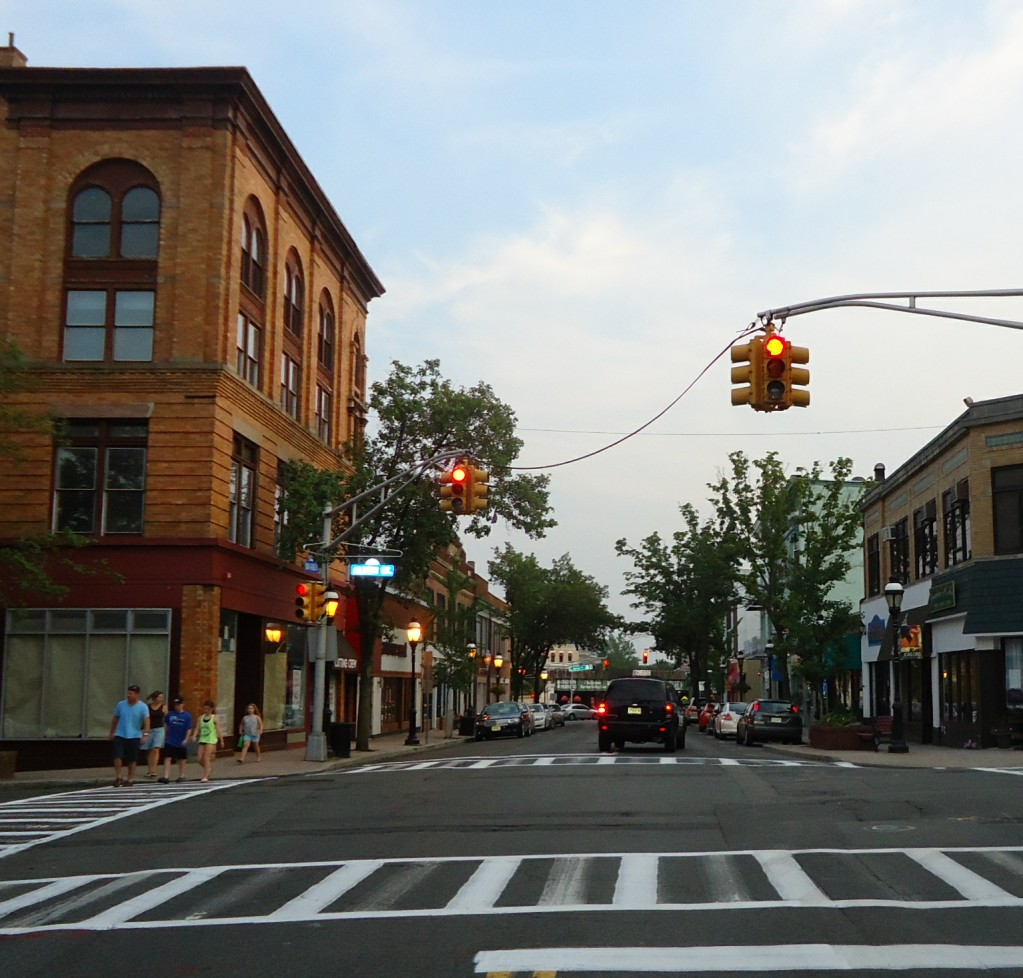
Intersection in downtown Cranford

The Riverfront redevelopment project on South Avenue brought restaurants and housing into downtown Cranford.

In the 1980s, Cranford founded the state's first special improvement district, which allows for the downtown district to have a special tax on building and business owners for downtown development and marketing which is managed by the Cranford Downtown Management Corporation. The DMC is governed by a Board of Directors consisting of business owners, property owners, and residents, members of which are appointed by the Township Committee.

The Riverside Inn was listed as a top U.S. bar by USA Today in 2026.

== Crime ==
Cranford was ranked the seventh safest municipality in New Jersey. In 2018 the Cranford crime rate was 28.47 per 100,000, which is lower than New Jersey's 208 crime rate, which is in turn lower than the United States' 381.

== Climate ==
The climate in this area is characterized by hot, humid summers and generally mild to cool winters. According to the Köppen Climate Classification system, Cranford has a humid subtropical climate, abbreviated "Cfa" on climate maps.

Climate data for Cranford, New Jersey.
| Month | Jan | Feb | Mar | Apr | May | Jun | Jul | Aug | Sep | Oct | Nov | Dec | Year |
|---|---|---|---|---|---|---|---|---|---|---|---|---|---|
| Record high °F (°C) | 73 (23) | 75 (24) | 90 (32) | 97 (36) | 96 (36) | 100 (38) | 105 (41) | 103 (39) | 99 (37) | 88 (31) | 81 (27) | 76 (24) | 105 (41) |
| Mean daily maximum °F (°C) | 40.1 (4.5) | 43.6 (6.4) | 52.6 (11.4) | 63.9 (17.7) | 73.7 (23.2) | 82.0 (27.8) | 86.7 (30.4) | 84.9 (29.4) | 77.7 (25.4) | 66.4 (19.1) | 55.8 (13.2) | 44.6 (7.0) | 64.3 (17.9) |
| Daily mean °F (°C) | 30.8 (−0.7) | 33.5 (0.8) | 41.6 (5.3) | 51.6 (10.9) | 61.4 (16.3) | 70.3 (21.3) | 75.2 (24.0) | 73.8 (23.2) | 66.4 (19.1) | 54.8 (12.7) | 45.5 (7.5) | 35.6 (2.0) | 53.4 (11.9) |
| Mean daily minimum °F (°C) | 21.5 (−5.8) | 23.3 (−4.8) | 30.5 (−0.8) | 39.3 (4.1) | 49.0 (9.4) | 58.6 (14.8) | 63.7 (17.6) | 62.6 (17.0) | 55.1 (12.8) | 43.1 (6.2) | 35.1 (1.7) | 26.6 (−3.0) | 42.4 (5.8) |
| Record low °F (°C) | −10 (−23) | −6 (−21) | 1 (−17) | 12 (−11) | 24 (−4) | 32 (0) | 42 (6) | 39 (4) | 33 (1) | 22 (−6) | 14 (−10) | −5 (−21) | −10 (−23) |
| Average precipitation inches (mm) | 3.72 (94) | 3.00 (76) | 4.25 (108) | 4.25 (108) | 4.52 (115) | 4.32 (110) | 5.08 (129) | 4.73 (120) | 4.66 (118) | 4.31 (109) | 4.16 (106) | 4.22 (107) | 51.22 (1,301) |
| Average snowfall inches (cm) | 6.9 (18) | 7.9 (20) | 3.7 (9.4) | 0.4 (1.0) | 0.0 (0.0) | 0.0 (0.0) | 0.0 (0.0) | 0.0 (0.0) | 0.0 (0.0) | 0.0 (0.0) | 0.4 (1.0) | 4.2 (11) | 23.5 (60) |
Source: The Western Regional Climate Center

== Government ==
=== Local government ===
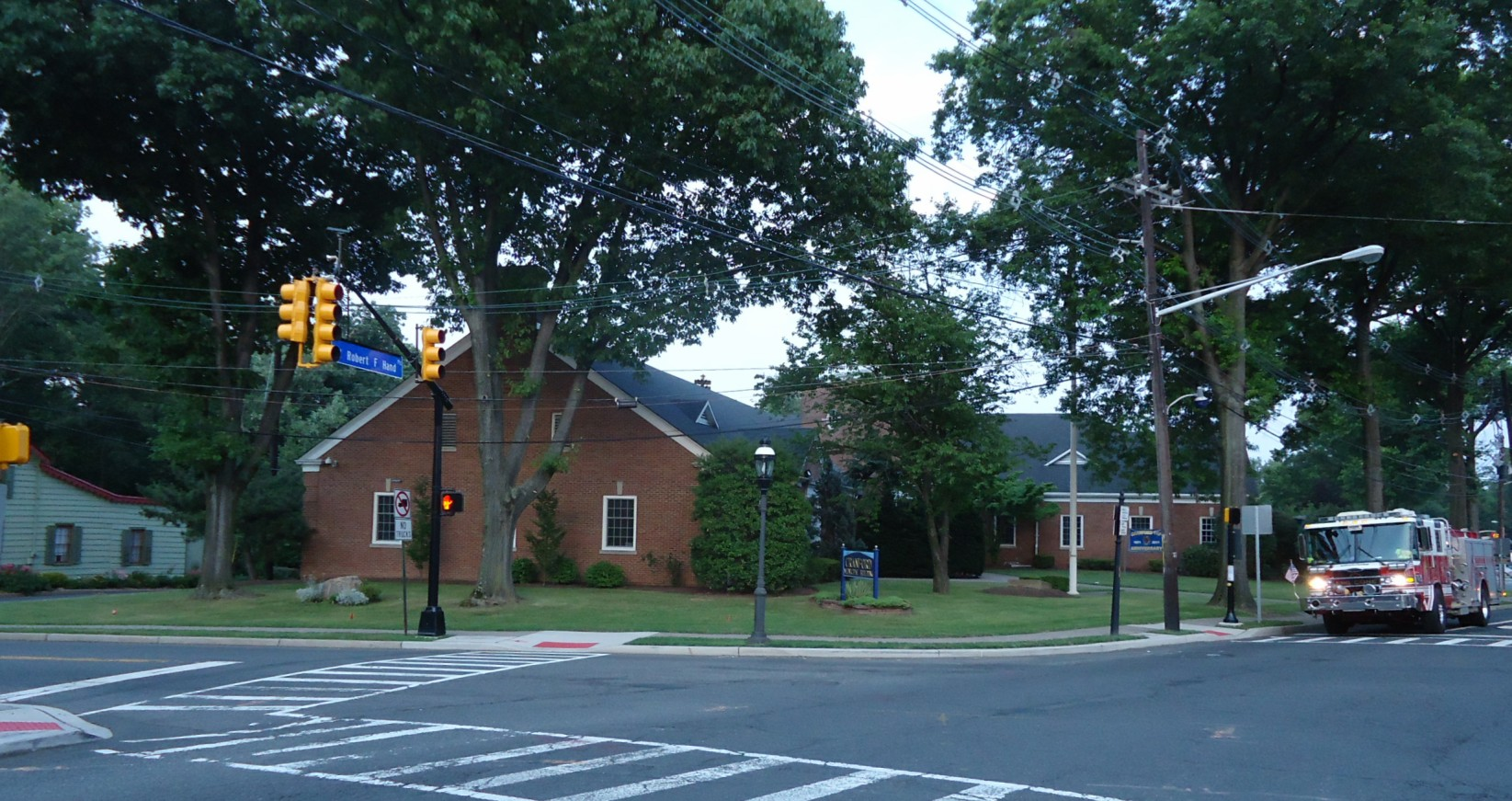
Scene near downtown

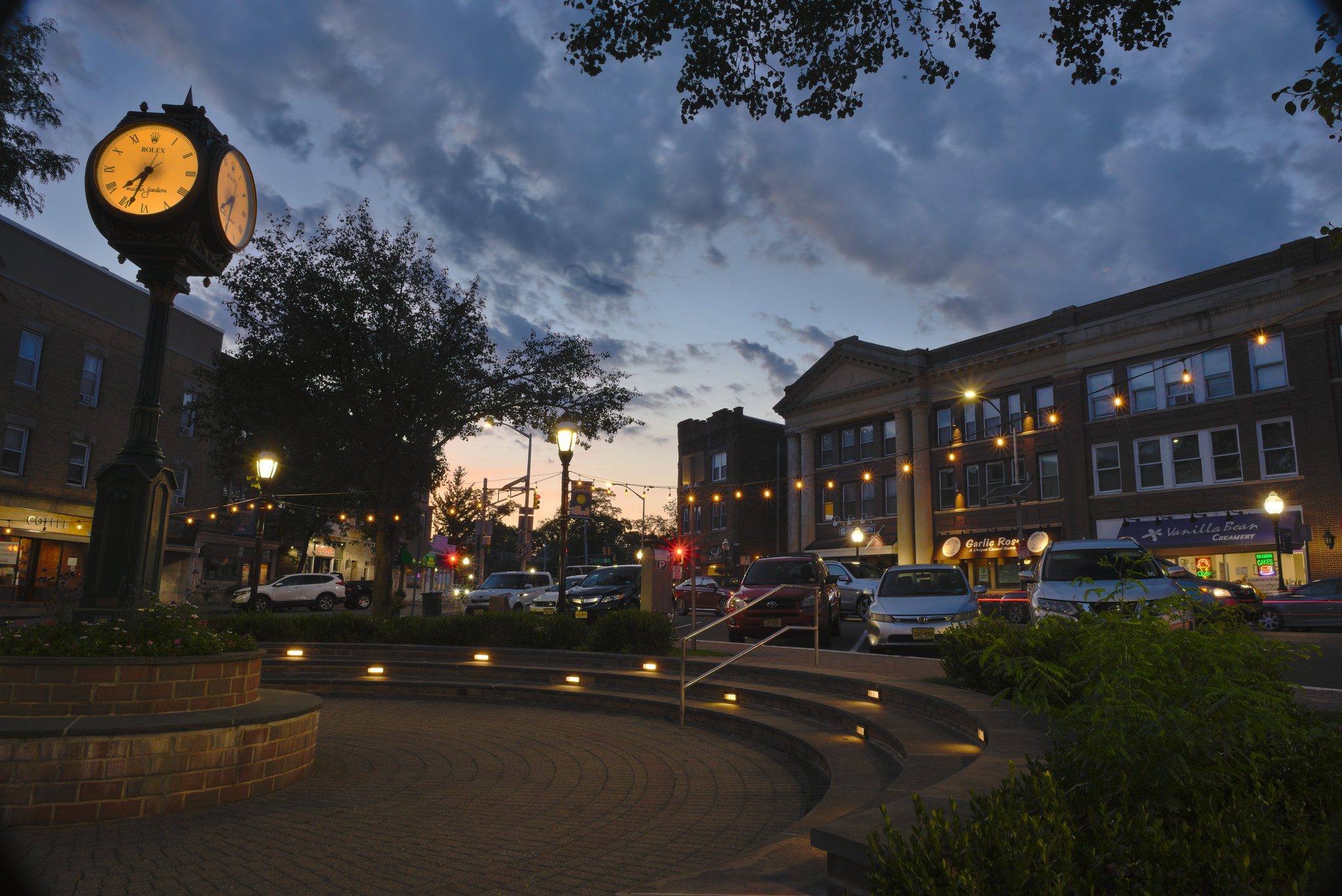
The town clock at twilight in downtown Cranford

Cranford is governed under the Township form of New Jersey municipal government, one of 141 municipalities (of the 564) statewide that use this form, the second-most commonly used form of government in the state. The Township Committee is comprised of five members, who are elected directly by the voters at-large in partisan elections to serve three-year terms of office on a staggered basis, with either one or two seats coming up for election each year as part of the November general election in a three-year cycle.

The Committee members elect a chairman of the committee who assumes the title of Mayor and another who is selected as Deputy Mayor. Both positions carry one-year terms. Four of the committee members take on departmental oversight assignments as Commissioner of Finance, Commissioner of Public Safety, Commissioner of Public Works and Engineering, and Commissioner of Public Affairs. The Mayor of Cranford does not take on a departmental assignment. The Township Committee is a part-time body and the township government is run on a day-to-day basis by the township administrator and various department heads. The chief of police is Matthew Nazzaro the township administrator is Lavona Patterson, and the township clerk is Patricia Donahue.

As of 2026, members of the Cranford Township Committee are Mayor Kathleen Miller Prunty (D, term on committee ends 2028; term as mayor ends December 31, 2026), Deputy Mayor Paul A. Gallo (D, term on committee ends 2026; term as deputy mayor ends 2026), Brian Andrews (D, 2026), Gina Black (R, 2027), and Terrence Curran (D, 2028).

==== Women in elected office ====
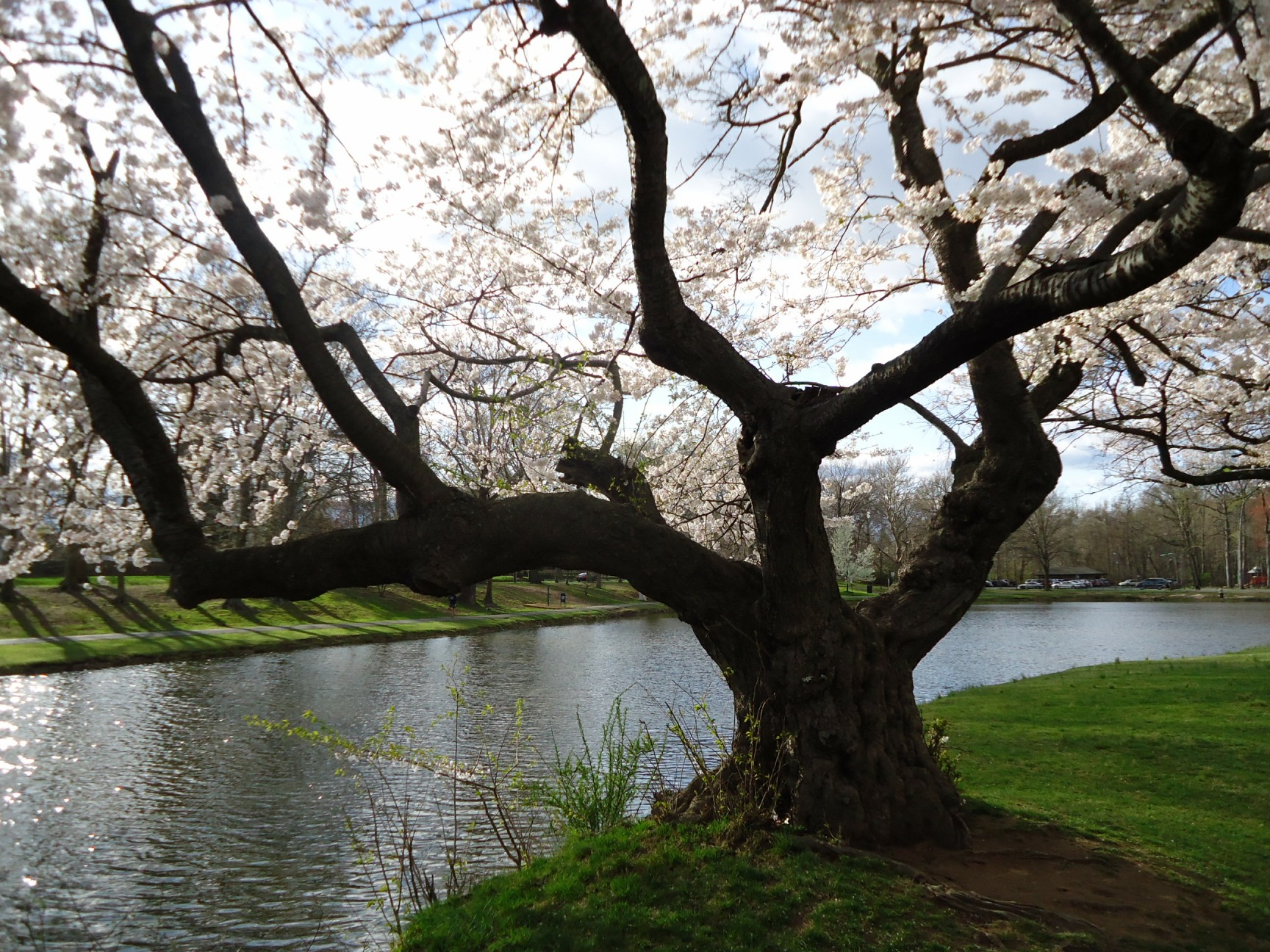
Tree in Nomahegan Park across from Union College

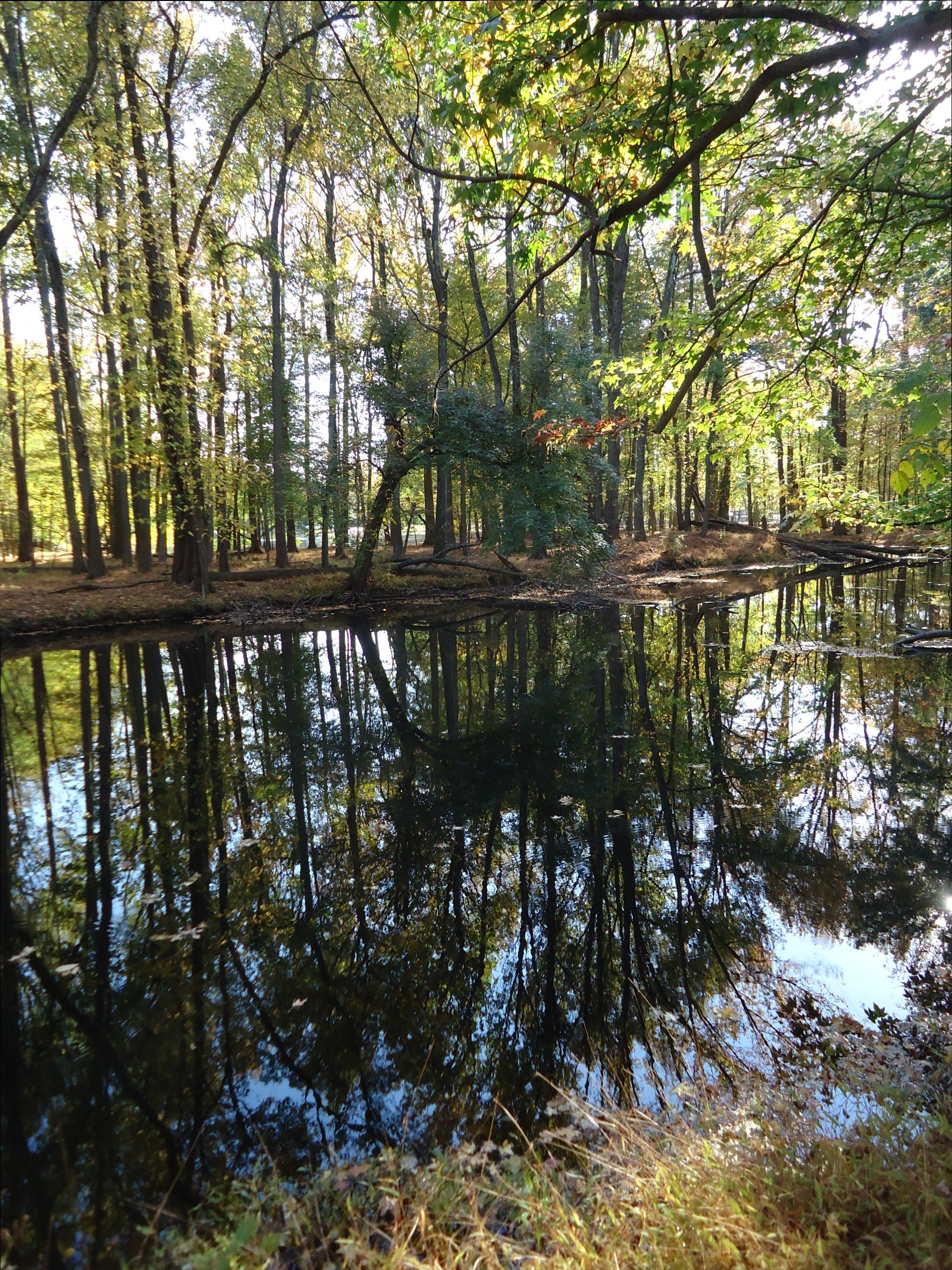
Nomahegan Park

Through 2022, a total of 12 women have been elected to the Cranford Township Committee, and four women have served as Mayor of Cranford. Barbara Brande was the first woman elected to the Township Committee and the first woman mayor of the township. Mayor Brande was elected to the Township Committee in 1974 and reelected in 1977, serving a total of six years. She was Mayor of Cranford in 1977. Carolyn Vollero, who served the longest length of time for a woman on the Township Committee—nine years—was Cranford's second female Mayor in 1994. Barbara Bilger, the township's third female mayor in 2002 and 2004, was also the first woman to serve two terms as the township's mayor. Mayor Bilger is the first Republican woman to serve as a township commissioner and as mayor.

Cranford resident Bette Jane Kowalski, the first woman from Cranford to be elected to the Union County Board of Chosen Freeholders (since renamed as the Board of County Commissioners), retired from office at the end of 2025, after serving seven consecutive three-year terms.

Female township commissioners include:

- Barbara Brande (Democrat) – 1975 to 1980 (Mayor in 1977)
- Sandy Weeks (Democrat) – 1982 to 1984
- Mary Lou Farmer (Democrat) – 1984 to 1986
- Carolyn Vollero (Democrat) – 1988 to 1996 (Mayor in 1994, Deputy Mayor in 1993)
- Barbara Bilger (Republican) – 1990 to 1992, 2002 to 2004 and Sept. 2015 to Nov. 2015 (Mayor in 2002 & 2004, Deputy Mayor in 1992 & 2003)
- Ann Darby (Republican) – 2003 to 2005 (Deputy Mayor in 2004)
- Martha Garcia (Republican) – 2008 to 2010 (Deputy Mayor in 2010)
- Lisa Adubato (Republican) – 2012 to Aug. 2015 (Deputy Mayor in 2014 and 2015 (part))
- Mary O'Connor (Republican) – 2014 to present (Deputy Mayor in 2015 (part) and 2016)
- Ann Dooley (Democrat) – 2016 to 2019 (Deputy Mayor in 2018 and 2019)
- Kathleen Miller Prunty (Democrat) – 2020 to present (Deputy Mayor 2020, Mayor 2021–2022, 2026 to present)
- Gina Black (Republican) – 2022 to present

=== Federal, state, and county representation ===
Cranford is located in the 10th Congressional District and is part of New Jersey's 22nd state legislative district.

For the 119th United States Congress, New Jersey's 10th congressional district is represented by LaMonica McIver (D, Newark). New Jersey is represented in the United States Senate by Democrats Cory Booker (Newark, term ends 2027) and Andy Kim (Moorestown, term ends 2031).

For the 2026–2027 session, the 22nd legislative district of the New Jersey Legislature is represented in the State Senate by Nicholas Scutari (D, Linden) and in the General Assembly by Linda S. Carter (D, Plainfield) and James J. Kennedy (D, Rahway).

Union County is governed by a Board of County Commissioners, whose nine members are elected at-large to three-year terms of office on a staggered basis with three seats coming up for election each year, with an appointed County Manager overseeing the day-to-day operations of the county. At an annual reorganization meeting held in the beginning of January, the board selects a Chair and Vice Chair from among its members. As of 2026, Union County's County Commissioners are:

Vice Chair Rebecca Williams (D, Plainfield, 2028), Chairman Joesph Bodek (D, Linden, 2026), James E. Baker Jr. (D, Rahway, 2027), Michele Delisfort (D, Union Township, 2026), Lourdes M. Leon (D, Elizabeth, 2026), Alexander Mirabella (D, Fanwood, 2027) Kimberly Palmieri-Mouded (D, Westfield, 2027). Stanley J. Neron (D, Elizabeth, 2028), Joseph Signorello III (D, Roselle Park, 2028)

Constitutional officers elected on a countywide basis are: Clerk Vacant - Incumbent Clerk Joanne Rajoppi (D, Union Township) died on July 16, 2026. Her death triggered a special election for a full five-year term to be held concurrently with the November 2026 general election. Deputy Clerk Clara Fernández assumes the powers of the office until the vacancy is filled. Sheriff Peter Corvelli (D, Kenilworth, 2026) and Surrogate Christopher E. Hudak (D, Clark, 2027).

=== Politics ===
As of March 2011, there were a total of 15,649 registered voters in Cranford Township, of which 4,887 (31.2% vs. 41.8% countywide) were registered as Democrats, 3,701 (23.7% vs. 15.3%) were registered as Republicans and 7,046 (45.0% vs. 42.9%) were registered as Unaffiliated. There were 15 voters registered as Libertarians or Greens. Among the township's 2010 Census population, 69.2% (vs. 53.3% in Union County) were registered to vote, including 91.2% of those ages 18 and over (vs. 70.6% countywide).

United States presidential election results for Cranford
| Year | Republican | | Democratic | | Third party(ies) | |
| Year | No. | % | No. | % | No. | % |
|---|---|---|---|---|---|---|
| 2024 | 6,016 | 40.73% | 8,453 | 57.23% | 301 | 2.04% |
| 2020 | 5,846 | 38.69% | 9,040 | 59.83% | 223 | 1.48% |
| 2016 | 5,559 | 42.35% | 7,057 | 53.77% | 509 | 3.88% |
| 2012 | 5,772 | 47.51% | 6,236 | 51.33% | 141 | 1.16% |
| 2008 | 6,371 | 48.83% | 6,513 | 49.92% | 164 | 1.26% |
| 2004 | 6,455 | 50.72% | 6,160 | 48.40% | 111 | 0.87% |

In the 2020 presidential election, Democrat Joe Biden received 170,245 votes in Union County beating Donald Trump's 80,002 votes. Joe Biden won Union County with 67.3% of the vote. In the 2016 presidential election, Democrat Hillary Clinton received 6,244 votes (52.3% vs. 65.6% countywide) beating Donald Trump's 5,110 votes (42.8% vs. 30.9% countywide) and other candidates receiving a combined total of 593 votes (4.9% vs. 3.6% countywide). From Cranford, 11,947 ballots were cast out of 16,844 registered voters (70% voter turnout vs. 68.87% countywide). In the 2012 presidential election, Democrat Barack Obama received 6,236 votes (51.0% vs. 66.0% countywide), ahead of Republican Mitt Romney with 5,772 votes (47.2% vs. 32.3%) and other candidates with 141 votes (1.2% vs. 0.8%), among the 12,223 ballots cast by the township's 16,332 registered voters, for a turnout of 74.8% (vs. 68.8% in Union County). In the 2008 presidential election, Democrat Barack Obama received 6,513 votes (49.6% vs. 63.1% countywide), ahead of Republican John McCain with 6,371 votes (48.6% vs. 35.2%) and other candidates with 164 votes (1.3% vs. 0.9%), among the 13,120 ballots cast by the township's 16,145 registered voters, for a turnout of 81.3% (vs. 74.7% in Union County). In the 2004 presidential election, Republican George W. Bush received 6,455 votes (50.4% vs. 40.3% countywide), ahead of Democrat John Kerry with 6,160 votes (48.1% vs. 58.3%) and other candidates with 111 votes (0.9% vs. 0.7%), among the 12,795 ballots cast by the township's 15,822 registered voters, for a turnout of 80.9% (vs. 72.3% in the whole county).

Gubernatorial election results for Cranford
| Year | Republican | | Democratic | | Third party(ies) | |
| Year | No. | % | No. | % | No. | % |
|---|---|---|---|---|---|---|
| 2025 | 5,054 | 40.37% | 7,400 | 59.11% | 65 | 0.52% |
| 2021 | 4,554 | 45.31% | 5,408 | 53.81% | 88 | 0.88% |
| 2017 | 3,598 | 43.68% | 4,433 | 53.81% | 207 | 2.51% |
| 2013 | 4,926 | 62.48% | 2,834 | 35.95% | 124 | 1.57% |
| 2009 | 4,787 | 52.70% | 3,421 | 37.66% | 875 | 9.63% |
| 2005 | 4,399 | 49.04% | 4,261 | 47.50% | 311 | 3.47% |

In the 2017 gubernatorial election, Democrat Phil Murphy received 4,433 votes (53.8% vs. 65.2% countywide), ahead of Republican Kim Guadagno with 3,598 votes (43.7% vs. 32.6%), and other candidates with 207 votes (2.5% vs. 2.1%), among the 8,424 ballots cast by the township's 17,268 registered voters, for a turnout of 48.8%. In the 2013 gubernatorial election, Republican Chris Christie received 62.5% of the vote (4,926 cast), ahead of Democrat Barbara Buono with 35.9% (2,834 votes), and other candidates with 1.6% (124 votes), among the 8,017 ballots cast by the township's 16,108 registered voters (133 ballots were spoiled), for a turnout of 49.8%. In the 2009 gubernatorial election, Republican Chris Christie received 4,787 votes (52.3% vs. 41.7% countywide), ahead of Democrat Jon Corzine with 3,421 votes (37.4% vs. 50.6%), Independent Chris Daggett with 793 votes (8.7% vs. 5.9%) and other candidates with 82 votes (0.9% vs. 0.8%), among the 9,146 ballots cast by the township's 15,871 registered voters, yielding a 57.6% turnout (vs. 46.5% in the county).

United States Senate election results for Cranford1
| Year | Republican | | Democratic | | Third party(ies) | |
| Year | No. | % | No. | % | No. | % |
|---|---|---|---|---|---|---|
| 2024 | 5,938 | 41.85% | 8,013 | 56.48% | 237 | 1.67% |
| 2018 | 4,631 | 45.84% | 5,003 | 49.52% | 469 | 4.64% |
| 2012 | 5,197 | 46.20% | 5,702 | 50.68% | 351 | 3.12% |
| 2006 | 4,520 | 50.94% | 4,155 | 46.82% | 199 | 2.24% |

United States Senate election results for Cranford2
| Year | Republican | | Democratic | | Third party(ies) | |
| Year | No. | % | No. | % | No. | % |
|---|---|---|---|---|---|---|
| 2020 | 6,088 | 40.80% | 8,632 | 57.85% | 201 | 1.35% |
| 2014 | 3,321 | 48.40% | 3,404 | 49.61% | 137 | 2.00% |
| 2013 | 2,600 | 50.57% | 2,472 | 48.08% | 69 | 1.34% |
| 2008 | 6,012 | 50.63% | 5,640 | 47.50% | 222 | 1.87% |

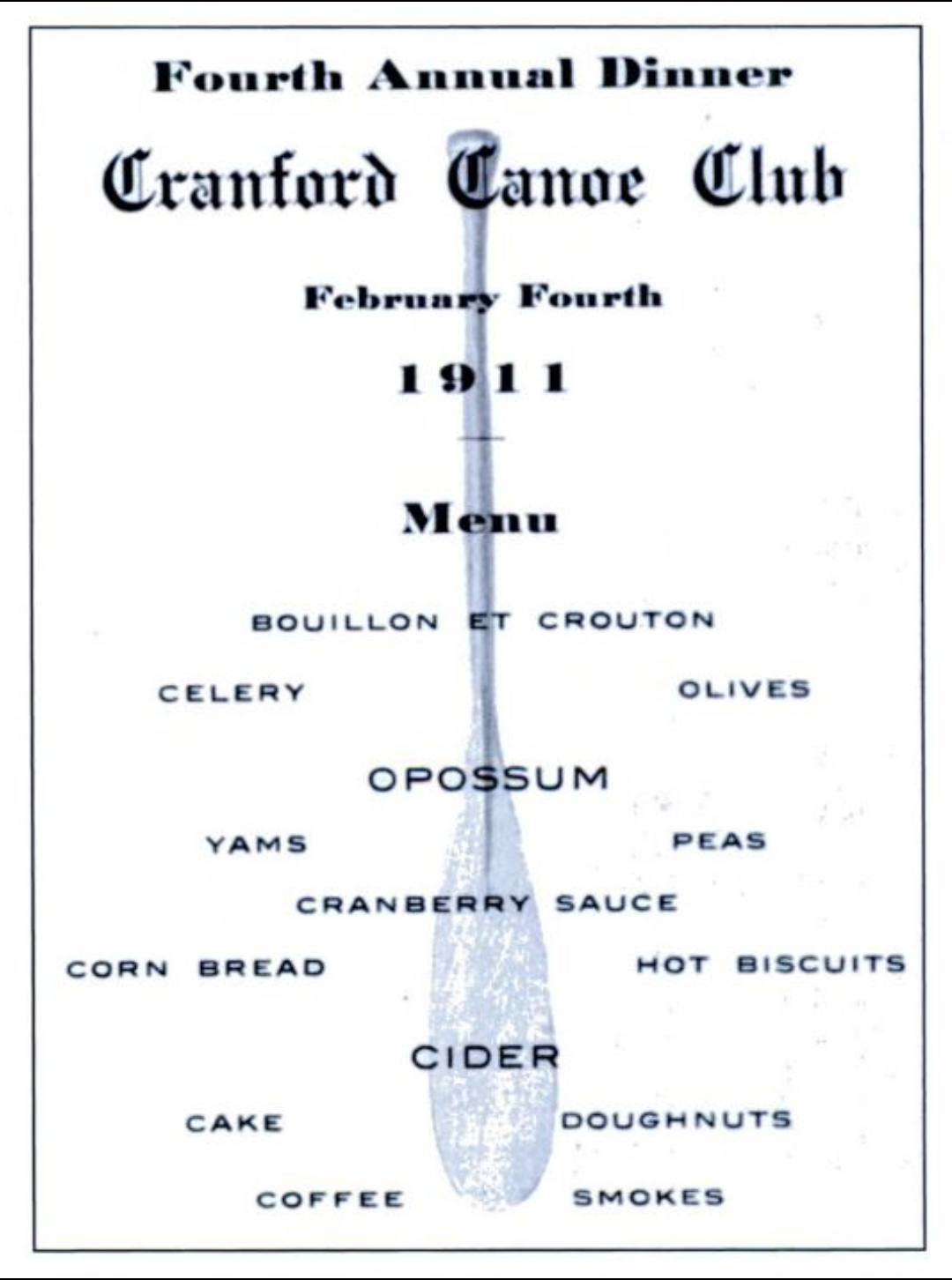
Menu at the Cranford Canoe Club's 1911 annual dinner

== Education ==
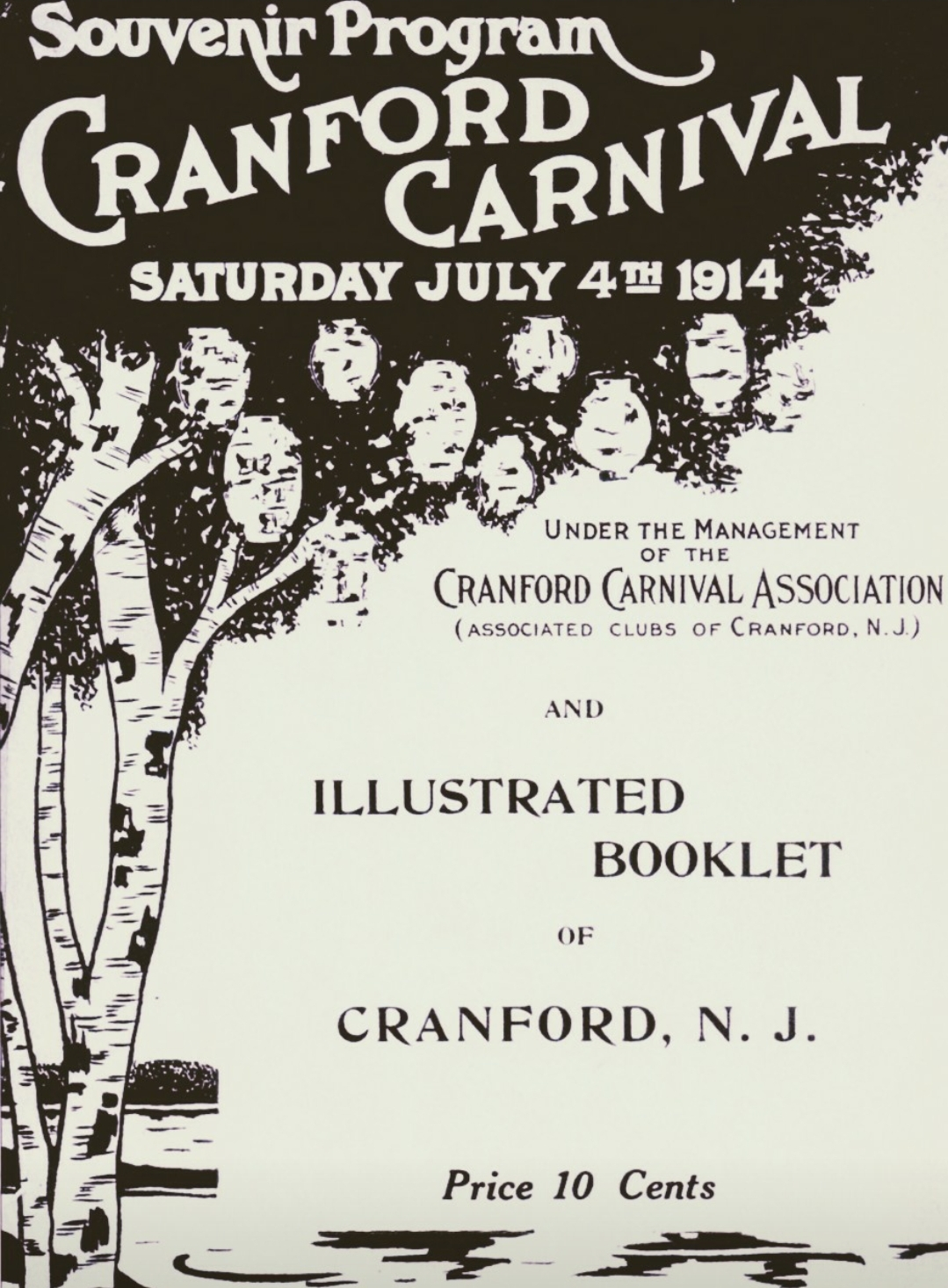
A program from the 1914 Cranford river carnival

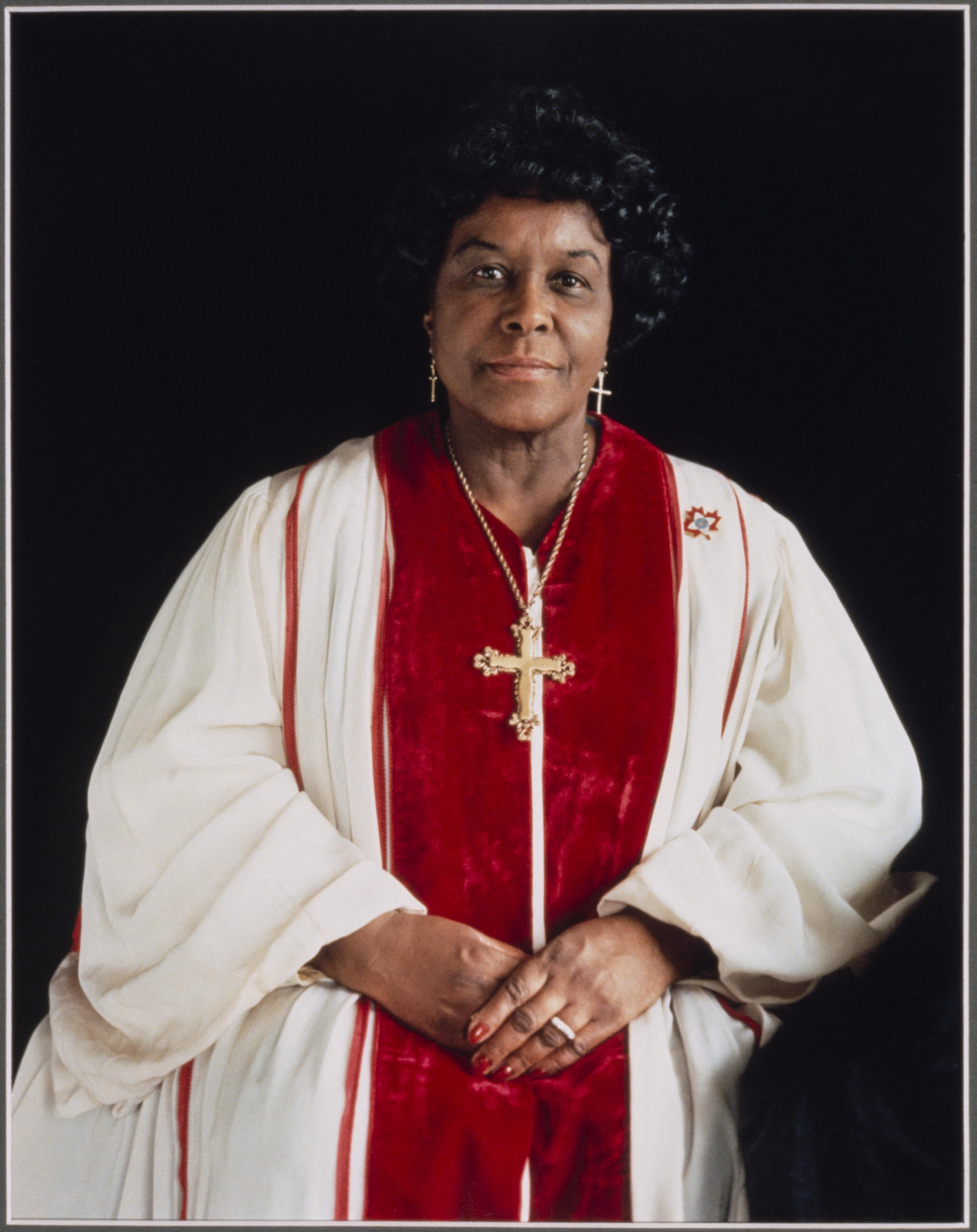
Columbia University-educated professor, Baptist minister, and Cranford native Deborah Cannon Partridge Wolfe was the first ordained African-American woman in the American Baptist Church

=== Public schools ===
The Cranford Township Public Schools is a comprehensive public school district serving students in kindergarten through twelfth grade. As of the 2022–23 school year, the district, comprised of seven schools, had an enrollment of 3,745 students and 334.1 classroom teachers (on an FTE basis), for a student–teacher ratio of 11.2:1. Schools in the district (with 2022–23 enrollment data from the National Center for Education Statistics) are Bloomingdale Avenue School with 233 students in grades K-2, Brookside Place School with 355 students in grades K-5, Hillside Avenue School with 734 students in grades K-8, Livingston Avenue School with 253 students in grades 3-5, Orange Avenue School with 765 students in grades 3-8, Walnut Avenue School with 294 students in grades PreK-2 and Cranford High School with 1,095 students in grades 9-12. Cranford High School's curriculum focuses on technology in the schools and stresses service learning. The high school was recognized for its work in service learning and for being a national school of character. Cranford High School was ranked 51st among 328 public high schools in New Jersey in 2012 by New Jersey Monthly magazine after being ranked 13th in 2010 and was among the top-ranked high schools in the state in 2020. Lincoln School, which is the home of the district's administrative offices, also houses the district's two alternative education programs, CAP and CAMP.

=== Private schools ===
Cranford hosts several religious and private schools. Saint Michael's School, located in downtown Cranford, is a Roman Catholic parochial school which serves students in Nursery through Grade 8 and is accredited by the Middle States Commission on Elementary Schools, operating under the auspices of the Roman Catholic Archdiocese of Newark.

Helen K. Baldwin Nursery School at the First Presbyterian Church was founded in 1956.

=== Union College ===
The main campus of Union College is located in Cranford; the school opened in 1933 in Roselle and has been located in Cranford since 1942. The school's Cranford campus, one of four county locations, covers 50 acres (20 ha) and was established in 1959.

== Local media ==
Cranford TV-35 public access logo

Cranford media includes:

- The Leader. Formerly The Westfield Leader, this locally published weekly newspaper covers all Cranford township committee meetings and offers other Cranford coverage.
- Union News Daily. A news outlet covering Union County news, it has a dedicated Cranford section. It is part of LocalSource and published by Worrall Community Newspapers of Union. The paper's Cranford coverage is also published on a monthly basis as Cranford Life.
- TAPInto Cranford is a local digital news site covering Cranford news exclusively, part of the TAPinto network of news in Central and Northern New Jersey. The Cranford edition reopened under new ownership in 2022.
- Cranford Patch is an online hyperlocal Cranford digital news site, part of the Patch local news network.
- Westfield + Cranford Local, a monthly magazine serving the two towns, launched in the early 2020s.
- Cranford Radio is a long-running podcast on Cranford news hosted by Bernie Wagenblast.
- Remaining multi-community newspapers include the Courier News, a daily newspaper based in Bridgewater Township, and The Star-Ledger and the Suburban News based in Newark.
- Cranford Monthly is published by Renna Media, located on Walnut Street in Cranford, NJ. 9,800 newspapers are printed up each month and mailed free.
- TV-35. Cranford also has its own channel, TV-35, which airs township committee meetings live each week and is available to cable and Verizon FiOS television subscribers. The channel was founded in 1986.
- Emergency radio. The township operates a low-power AM radio station at 680 kHz, WQWE 201, which provides information during emergencies in the township.
- The Cranford Chronicle (formerly the Cranford Citizen & Chronicle) established in 1893 closed in June 2015.

== Arts and culture ==
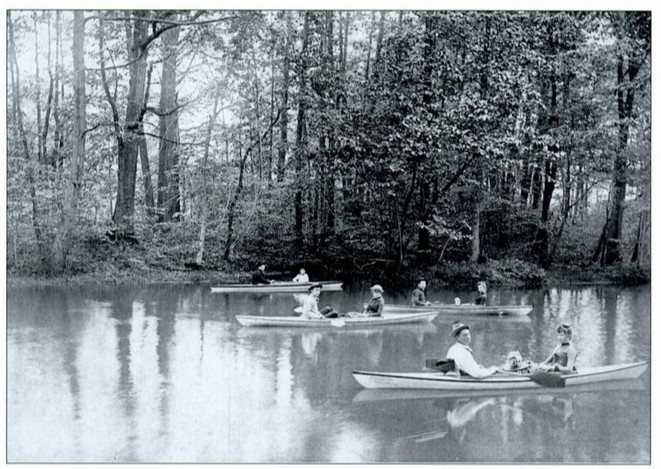
Rowers on the Rahway River in Cranford, c. 1885

- The Cranford Film Festival at the Cranford Theater is held annually.
- The Garden State Film Festival began holding festival screenings at the township's century-old film theater, the Cranford Theater, in 2021. A small performing arts stage, in front of one of the screens, opened at the film theater in 2022.
- The Cranford Dramatic Club is a local theatrical company founded in 1918 that puts on various annual productions. The company has its own small performing arts theater on the south side of town.
- PorchFest is an annual music festival in Cranford starting in 2017. Performances are held on lawns and porches in town.
- Dreyer Farms, the last remaining working farm in Union County, hosts art shows and performances in the offseason.
- The Roy W. Smith Theater and Tomasulo Art Gallery at Union College offer live performances and art shows.
- The Cranford Public Library began in 1910 as a Carnegie library.
- American Atheists is headquartered in Cranford.
- The inaugural Welcome to Our House house music festival was held downtown in June 2025.
- The Cranford St. Patrick's Day parade is typically held the Sunday before St. Patrick's Day.

== Places of worship ==
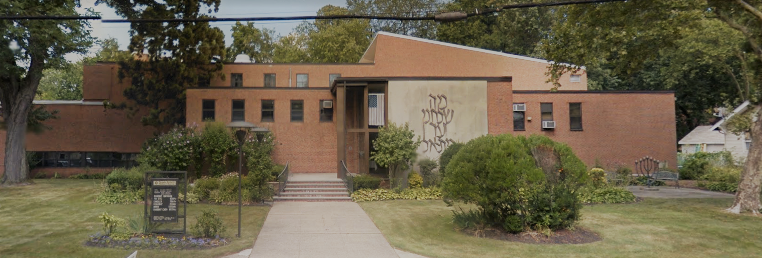
Temple Beth-El Mekor Chayim on Walnut Avenue in Cranford

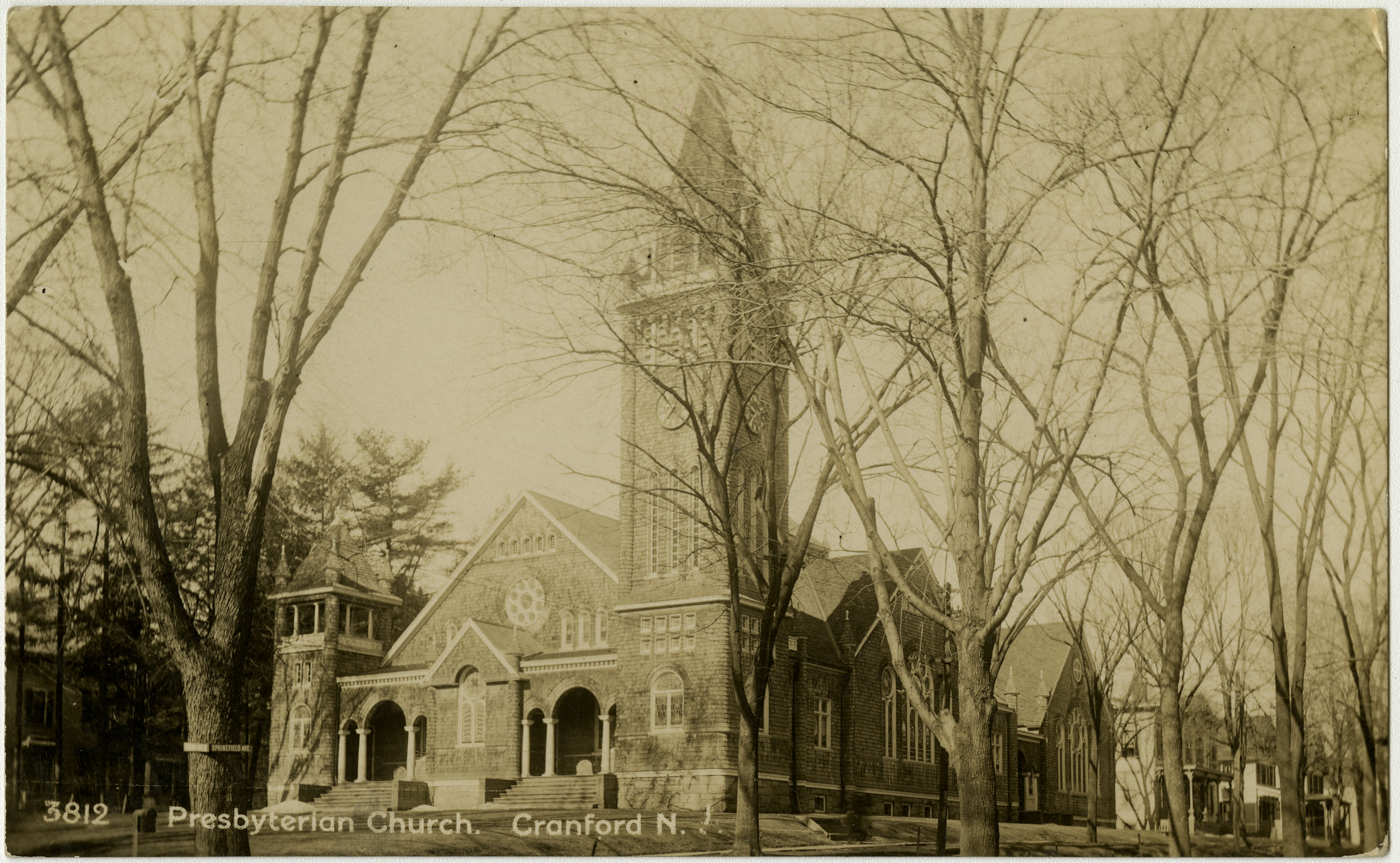
Cranford's First Presbyterian Church c. 1910

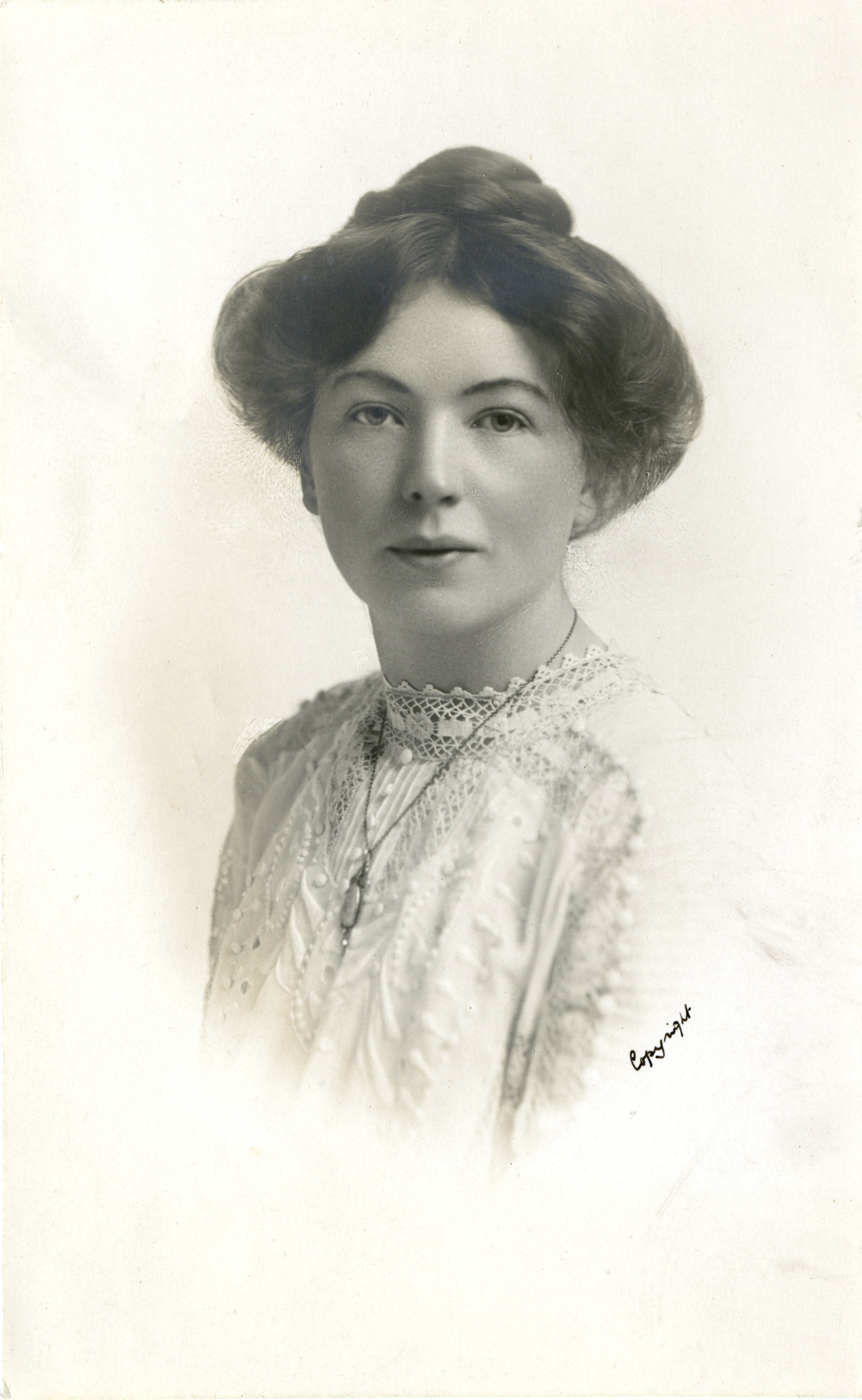
British suffragette Christabel Pankhurst, c. 1910

- The Cranford United Methodist Church, at the corner of Walnut and Lincoln Avenue, was founded as Cranford's Methodist congregation in the 1850s. It is an LGBTQ-welcoming community, making a "reconciling commitment to intersectional LGBTQ justice." Its brick sanctuary was built in 1954.
- Temple Beth-El Mekor Chayim, on Walnut Avenue in Cranford, has been a community of worship for more than 100 years, serving the Cranford and Union County area egalitarian-traditional Jewish community.
- Trinity Episcopal Church on Forest Avenue was founded in 1872. Its day school offers preschool, kindergarten, and elementary aftercare programs.
- First Presbyterian Church of Cranford on Springfield Avenue, home to Helen K. Baldwin Nursery School, was founded in 1850.
- The First Baptist Church on High Street was founded in June 1887. Its former minister, Cranford native Deborah Cannon Partridge Wolfe, was the first Black woman ordained by the American Baptist Church.
- St. Michael's Church on Alden Street was founded as the township's Roman Catholic parish in 1872. It serves local Catholics with daily Mass and parish activities. It is affiliated with the Roman Catholic Archdiocese of Newark and is named for the archangel known as Michael.
- The Cranford Alliance Church that stands at the corner of Cherry and Retford was founded as a Bible study in 1898, and organized as a church under the teachings of Pastor A. B. Simpson in 1905. Its permanent location at 7 Cherry Street was dedicated in 1924. British suffragette Christabel Pankhurst spoke at the church in 1929.
- Calvary Lutheran Church on Eastman Street was founded in the 1920s. Its Calvary Nursery School opened in 1993.

== Transportation ==
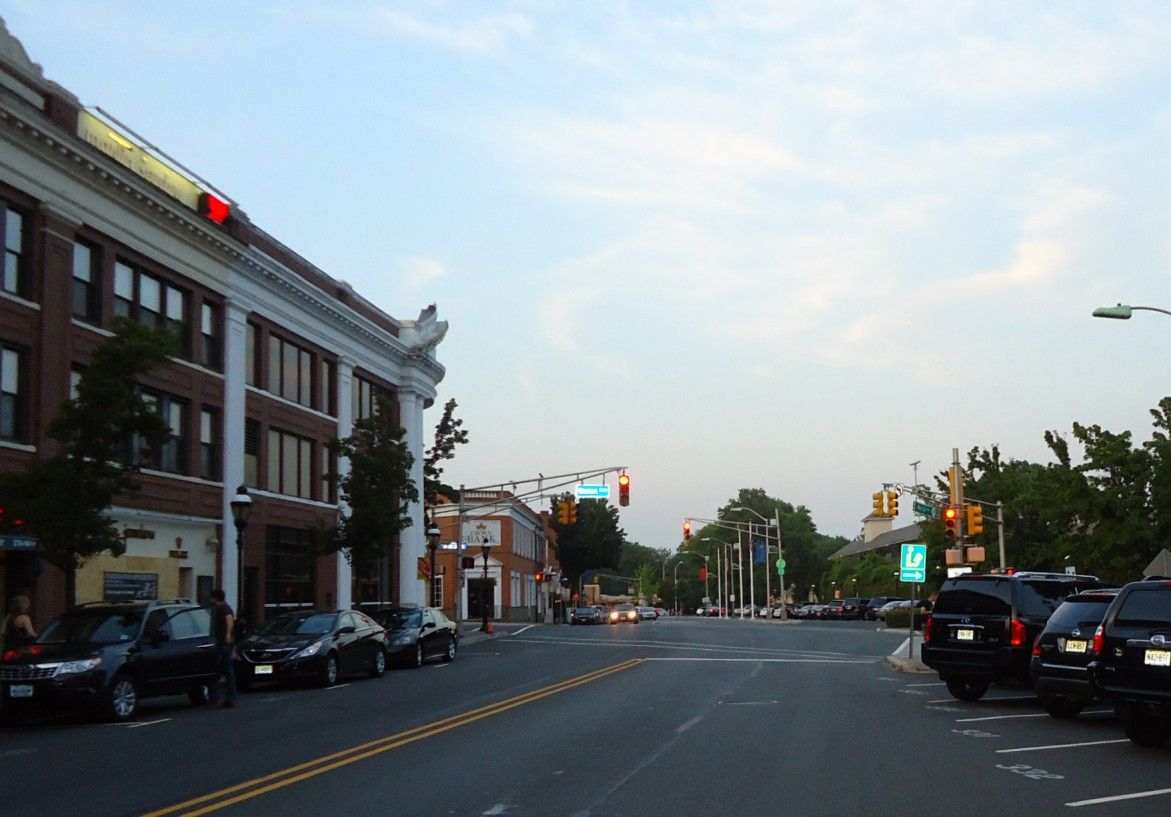
The Cranford station is to the lower right and offers commuter service to Newark and elsewhere.

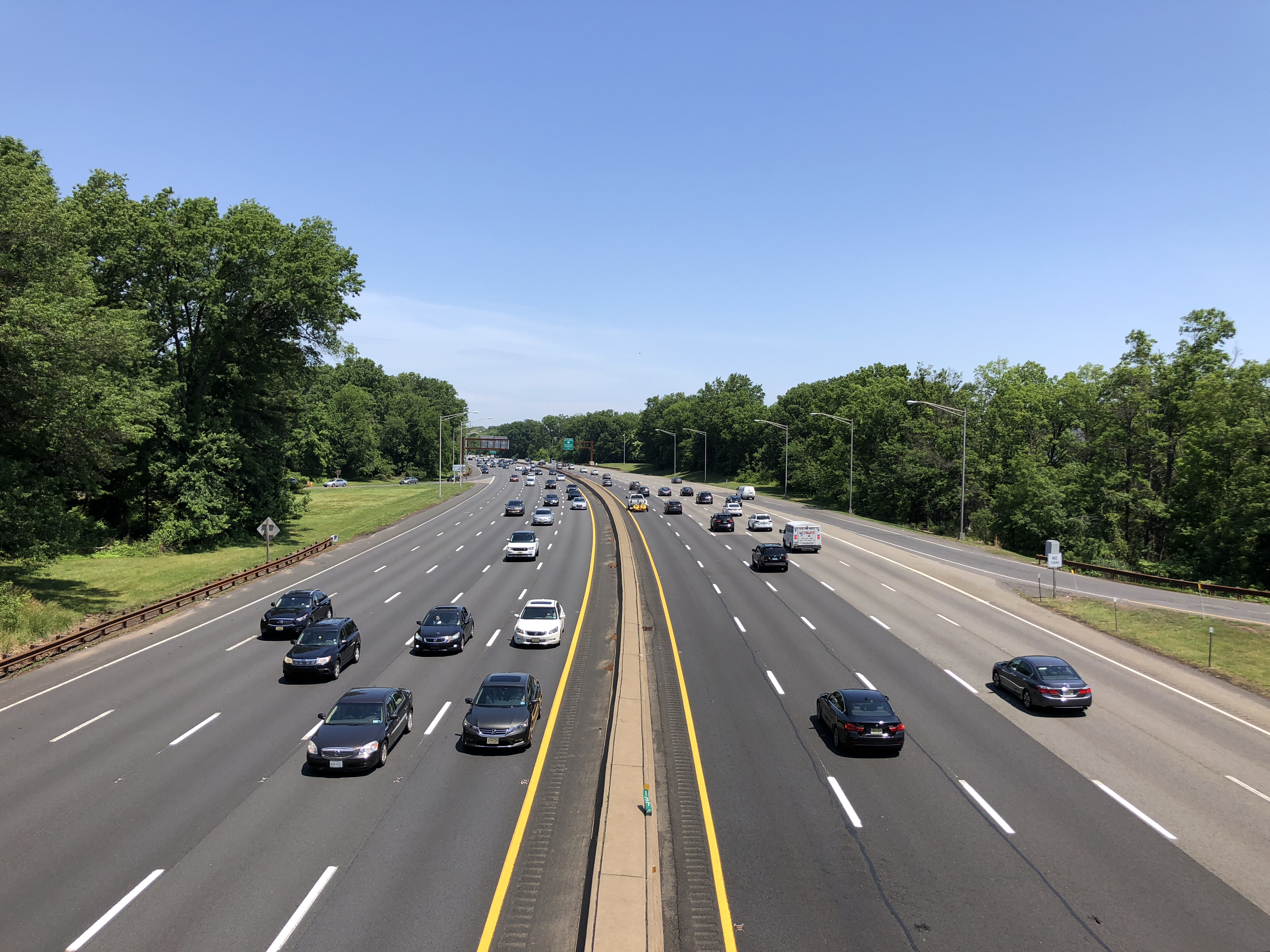
View north along the Garden State Parkway in Cranford

=== Roads and highways ===
As of May 2010, the township had a total of 78.60 miles (126.49 km) of roadways, of which 67.25 miles (108.23 km) were maintained by the municipality, 7.77 miles (12.50 km) by Union County, 1.72 miles (2.77 km) by the New Jersey Department of Transportation and 1.86 miles (2.99 km) by the New Jersey Turnpike Authority.

The major roadways in the township are the Garden State Parkway and Route 28 (North Avenue). The parkway runs along the eastern border of the township, connecting Clark in the south to Kenilworth in the north. The Parkway is accessible at interchange 136 to County Route 607 for Linden / Roselle / Winfield Park and at interchange 137 for Route 28, which runs east–west through the center of the township. Interchange 136 is known as the "four corners", where Clark, Winfield, Cranford and Linden meet.

Cranford's Pace Car Program aims to make the township's roads safer roads by encouraging drivers to pledge to "drive within the posted speed limit", "stop at all stop signs", "stop at all red traffic lights", and "yield to pedestrians in crosswalks".

=== Public transportation ===
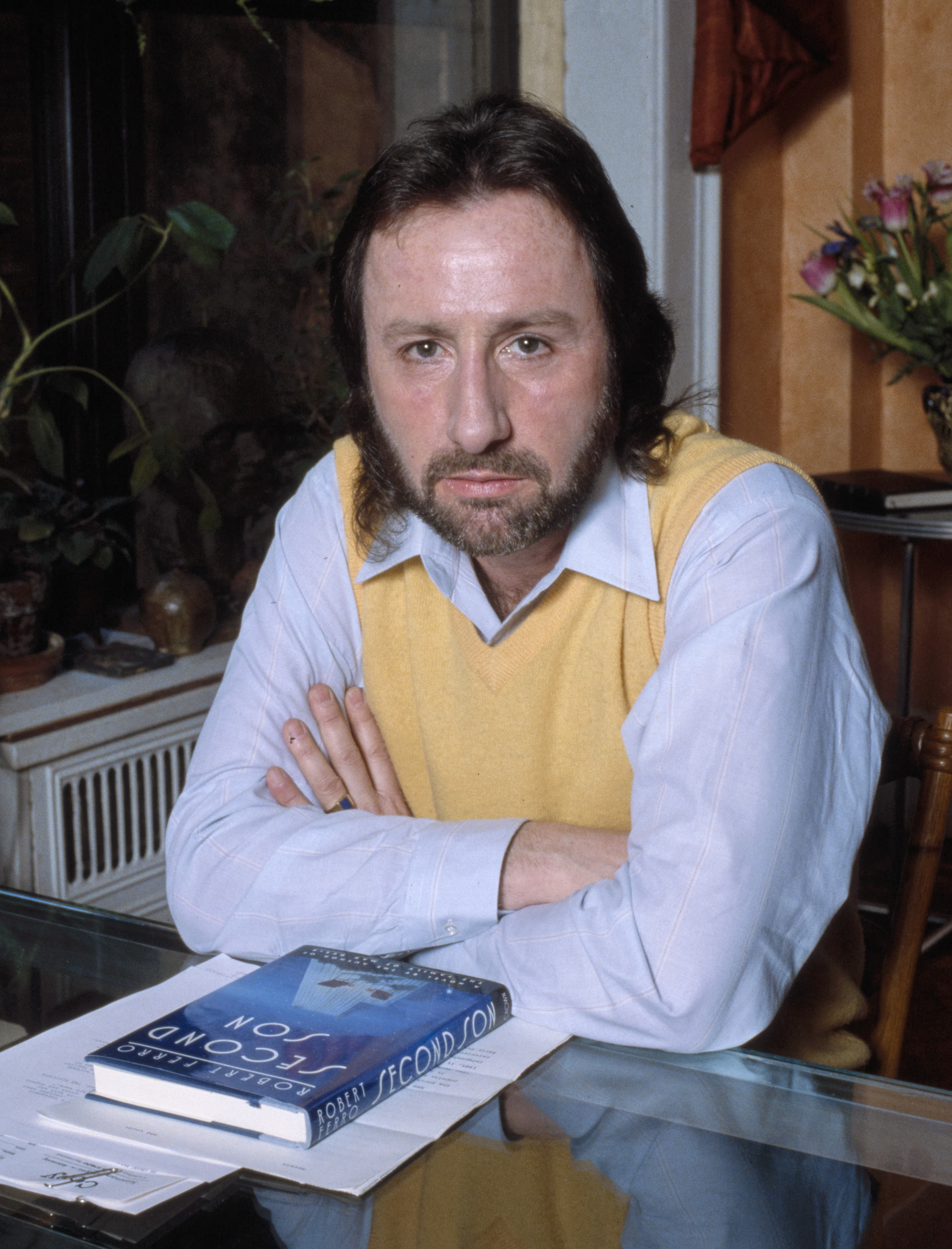
Novelist Robert Ferro of the Violet Quill, who attended Cranford High School

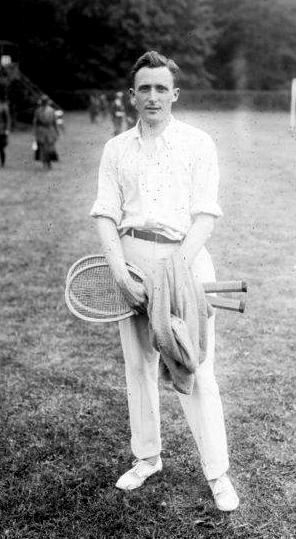
Cranford tennis player Dean Mathey, namesake of Mathey College at Princeton University

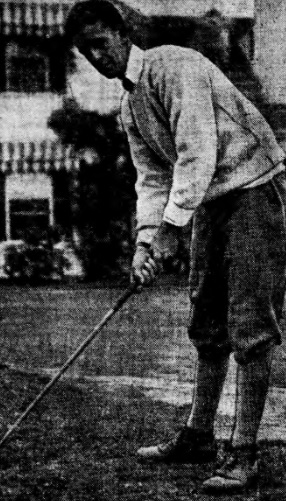
Cranford golf champion Max Marston

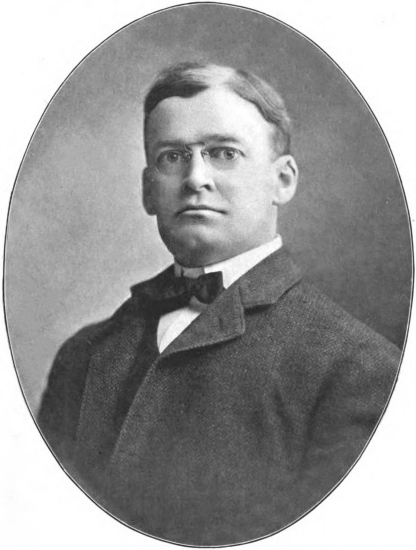
Cranford resident John Moody founded Moody's Investors Service

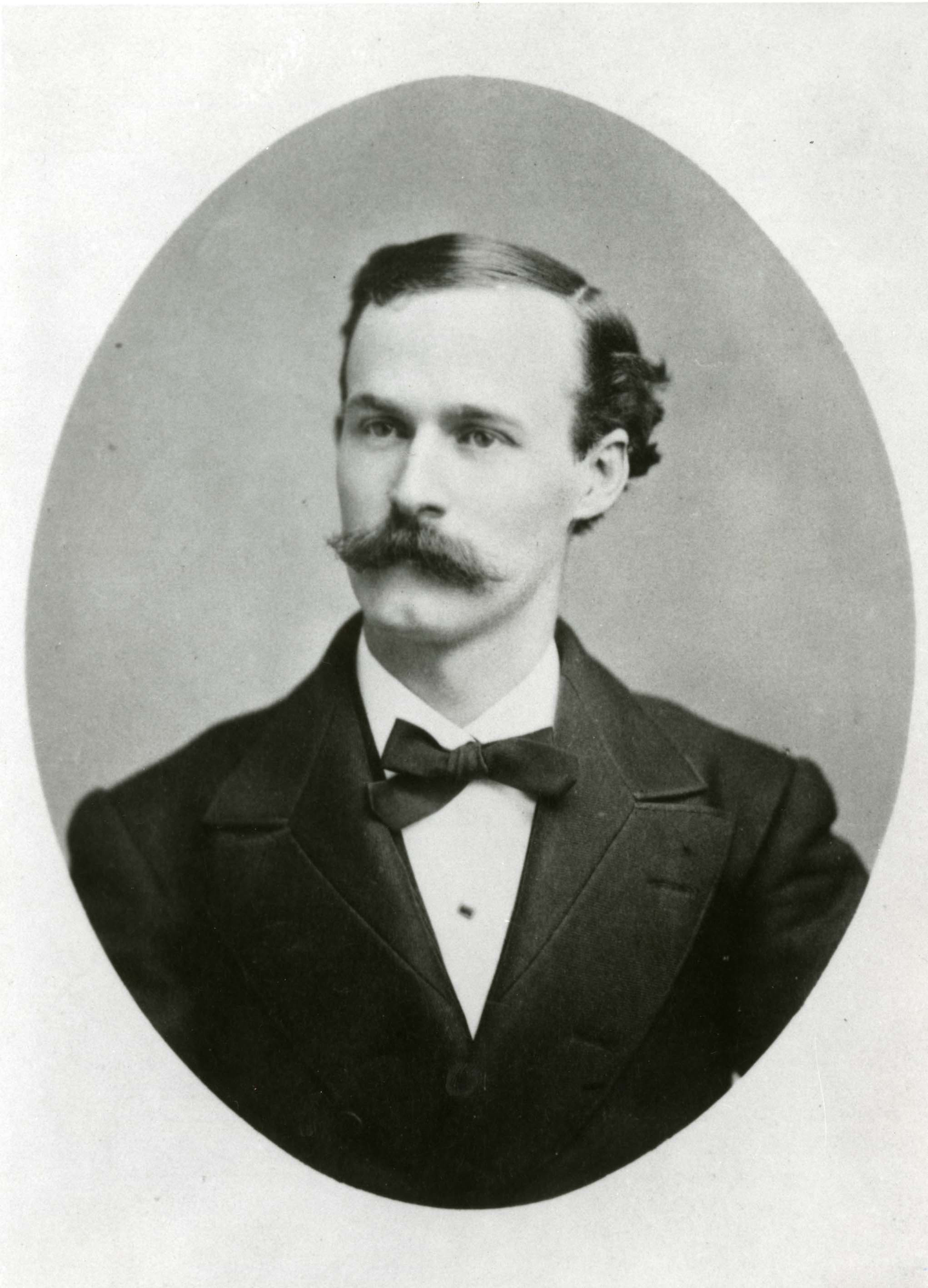
American advertising pioneer J. Walter Thompson moved to Cranford in 1892.

==== Rail ====
The Cranford station offers train service to Newark Penn Station in about 20 minutes, and to New York Penn Station in about 49 minutes in total. The World Trade Center station on PATH can likewise be reached from Cranford in under 50 minutes (42 minutes on 6:52 am express).

Cranford Station also offers transit to other points east, along with Raritan, High Bridge and numerous points west on the NJ Transit Raritan Valley Line, formerly the mainline of the Central Railroad of New Jersey. Via Newark Penn Station, Secaucus Junction and NYC Penn Station, connections are possible to most other NJ Transit rail lines, PATH trains, AirTrain Newark to Newark Liberty International Airport, Amtrak regional / long-distance trains and the Long Island Rail Road.

==== Bus ====
An express bus route (the 113x) offers nonstop weekday travel from the north side of the Cranford Station, and other Cranford points on North Avenue, to Port Authority Bus Terminal in midtown Manhattan in about 40 minutes. The private bus service Boxcar provides direct commuter bus routes to midtown Manhattan in about 40 minutes.

NJ Transit also provides bus service on the 112 and 113 routes between Cranford and the Port Authority Bus Terminal in New York City and on the 59 and 66 to Newark. The 56, 57 and 58 routes provide local service.

==== Air ====
Newark Liberty International Airport is approximately 13 minutes away in Newark / Elizabeth. Linden Airport, a general aviation facility, is in nearby Linden.

==== Freight ====
The southern section of the township is bisected by Conrail's freight-only Lehigh Line (jointly owned by CSX and Norfolk Southern Railway) along the tracks of the former Lehigh Valley Railroad. The former Staten Island Railway connects with the Raritan Valley Line in Cranford, reaching the island via the Arthur Kill Vertical Lift Bridge. That line has been rehabilitated and since 2007 between Port Newark and Howland Hook and transports containers from the Howland Hook Marine Terminal, an intermodal freight transport service known as ExpressRail.

== In film and television ==
Several episodes in the third season of the 1990s Nickelodeon television show, The Adventures of Pete & Pete were filmed in Cranford. Episodes of the series were shot at various sites in Cranford, including Brookside Place School, Cranford High School, Orange Avenue Pool and Modern Barber Shop. Scenes for the home of the title characters were filmed at a house at 11 Willow Street. Cranford is the setting of the 2005 film Guess Who, starring Bernie Mac and Ashton Kutcher. Portions of the films Far from Heaven, Garden State, September 12 and HBO's miniseries The Plot Against America were shot in Cranford.

Billy Eichner's comedy Bros filmed a Pride parade scene in Downtown Cranford. Additional film shoots in town during the 2020s have included Maybe I Do, Mothers' Instinct, Dumb Money, Eileen, Daughter of the Bride, Sweethearts, Cat Person, and Presence.

== Notable people ==
People who were born in, residents of, or otherwise closely associated with Cranford include:

- Valentino Ambrosio (born 2000), American football placekicker who played for the Tulane Green Wave football team
- Frederick W. Beinecke (1887–1971), founder of Yale University's Beinecke Rare Book & Manuscript Library
- William Sperry Beinecke (1914–2018), founder of the Central Park Conservancy and former chairman of S&H Green Stamps
- Carol Blazejowski (born 1956), member of Basketball Hall of Fame
- Gordon Chalmers (1911–2000), swimmer, swimming coach, and college athletics administrator. He competed in the men's 100 meter backstroke at the 1932 Summer Olympics
- William A. Chatfield (born 1951), government executive and lobbyist who served as the 11th Director of the Selective Service System, from 2004 to 2009
- Curtis G. Culin (1915–1963), sergeant in the 2d Armored Division during World War II who developed the rhino tank to cut through hedgerows during the Battle of Normandy
- Howard "Dutch" Darrin (1897–1982), free-lance automotive stylist
- Hugh S. Delano (1933–2015), sports journalist for the New York Post and author honored by induction into the Hockey Hall of Fame with the Elmer Ferguson Memorial Award
- Maria Dizzia (born 1974), actress who was nominated for the 2010 Tony Award for Best Performance by a Featured Actress in a Play for her performance in In the Next Room (or The Vibrator Play)
- William C. Dudley (born 1952), economist who served as president and CEO of the Federal Reserve Bank of New York and Vice Chairman of the Federal Open Market Committee
- Robert Ferro (1941–1988), LGBT author whose work included a gay coming-of-age novel describing a fictionalized version of Cranford centered around the Rahway River
- Charles N. Fowler (1852–1932), represented 5th congressional district in the United States House of Representatives from 1895 to 1911
- Will Fries (born 1998), offensive guard for the Minnesota Vikings of the National Football League
- Albert M. Gessler (1919–2003), ExxonMobil research chemist known for the development of elastomeric thermoplastics
- Edward K. Gill (1917–1985), politician who served as Mayor of Cranford and was elected to two terms of office in the New Jersey General Assembly, where he represented the 21st Legislative District
- Gordon Graceffo (born 2000), professional baseball pitcher for the St. Louis Cardinals
- Karen Hummer (born 1962), former competitor in judo who became the youngest US National Champion in the sport when she won a title at the age of 12
- Marc Johnstone (born 1996), NHL hockey forward for the Pittsburgh Penguins
- Gary Kott (born c. 1947), television and advertising writer, who was a writer and supervising producer of The Cosby Show
- Alice Lakey (1857–1935), pure foods activist
- Frank Townsend Lent (1855–1919), architect, painter and author
- Paul J. Lioy (1947–2015), specialist in the field of environmental health and specializing in exposure science who analyzed the effects of dust in the wake of the collapse of the World Trade Center after the September 11 terrorist attacks
- Greg Mankiw (born 1958), Harvard professor who chaired the Council of Economic Advisers under President George W. Bush
- Ralph J. Marra Jr. (born c. 1953), former Acting United States Attorney for the District of New Jersey
- Max Marston (1892–1949), winner of the 1923 United States Amateur Championship golf tournament
- Dean Mathey (1890–1972), tennis player and namesake of Mathey College at Princeton University
- John Moody (1868–1958), financial analyst and founder of Moody's Investors Service
- Bill Murphy (born 1989), professional baseball pitching coach for the Houston Astros
- Victoria Napolitano (née Spellman, born 1988), politician who was chosen as mayor of Moorestown, New Jersey, at age 26, making her the youngest female mayor in state history
- Nancy Salzman (born 1954), felon convicted for her role as the co-founder of NXIVM, a multi-level marketing company and cult
- David Silverman (born 1966), president of American Atheists
- Thomas Sperry (c. 1864–1913), co-founder (the "S") of S&H Green Stamps
- William Miller Sperry (1858–1927), president of S&H Green Stamps and namesake of the William Miller Sperry Observatory and Sperry Park, who moved to Cranford in 1898
- Joseph Striker (1898–1974), actor who appeared on film and in Broadway theatre
- John Coard Taylor (1901–1946), track and field athlete who placed fifth in the men's 400 meters at the 1924 Summer Olympics. He was national champion in the 220-yd low hurdles in 1922
- James Walter Thompson (1847–1928), namesake of the J. Walter Thompson Company advertising agency
- Walter F. Timpone (born 1950), former Associate Justice of the New Jersey Supreme Court, who served from 2016 to 2020
- Harriet Morgan Tyng (1905–1952), poet and educator
- Bernie Wagenblast (born 1956), voiceover performer and former traffic reporter who is the founder and editor of the Transportation Communications Newsletter
- Jennifer Westhoven (born 1971), business and finance correspondent on HLN's Morning Express with Robin Meade
- Jordan White (born 1984), rock musician and American Idol contestant
- Deborah Cannon Partridge Wolfe (1916–2004), noted educator, Cranford native, and namesake of the Deborah Cannon Partridge Wolfe College of Education at New Jersey City University
