= Sperry =

Sperry may refer to:

== Places ==
In the United States:

- Sperry, Iowa, community in Des Moines County
- Sperry, Missouri
- Sperry, Oklahoma, town in Tulsa County
- Sperry Chalet, historic backcountry chalet, Glacier National Park, Montana
- Sperry Glacier, located in Glacier National Park in the state of Montana
- William Miller Sperry Observatory or Sperry Observatory, an astronomical observatory owned by Union County College and operated by Amateur Astronomers, Incorporated on Union County College on their Cranford, New Jersey campus

== Sperry Corporation ==
- Sperry Corporation, a former American equipment and electronics manufacturer (1910–1986)
  - Sperry Gyroscope Company (1910–1933), founded by Elmer Ambrose Sperry
    - Lawrence Sperry Aircraft Company (1918–1924), founded by Lawrence Sperry
  - Sperry Corporation, 1933–1955
  - Sperry Rand, 1955–1978
  - Sperry Corporation, 1978–1986
- Honeywell v. Sperry Rand, a landmark U.S. federal court case that in April 1973 invalidated the 1964 patent for the ENIAC

== Other uses ==
- Sperry Department Store, Port Huron, Michigan
- Sperry (surname)
- Sperry & Hutchinson, a brand of trading stamps
- Sperry Top-Sider, a brand of boat shoes
- The Secrets of Jonathan Sperry, an American film released in 2009
- USS Charles S. Sperry (DD-697), a former US Navy destroyer
- USS Sperry (AS-12), Fulton-class submarine tender in the United States Navy
