= FTC v. R. F. Keppel & Bro., Inc. =

Federal Trade Commission v. R. F. Keppel & Bro.
- Supreme Court of the United States

Argued February 5, 1934 Decided April 30, 1934
- Full case name: Federal Trade Commission v. R. F. Keppel & Bro.
- Citations: 291 U.S. 304 (more) 54 S. Ct. 423; 78 L. Ed. 814

Case history
- Prior: R. F. Keppel & Bro. v. Federal Trade Commission, F.2d 81 (3d Cir. 1932).

Holding
- The Federal Trade Commission may prohibit trade practices that resemble gambling devices and harm competition even when they are not prohibited by criminal law.

Court membership
- Chief Justice Charles E. Hughes Associate Justices Willis Van Devanter · James C. McReynolds; Louis Brandeis · George Sutherland; Pierce Butler · Harlan F. Stone; Owen Roberts · Benjamin N. Cardozo

Case opinion
- Majority: Brandeis, joined by Hughes, Van Devanter, McReynolds, Sutherland, Butler, Roberts, Cardozo

Laws applied
- Federal Trade Commission Act

Federal Trade Commission v. R. F. Keppel & Bro., 291 U.S. 304 (1934), was a Supreme Court of the United States case in which the Court held that the Federal Trade Commission could prohibit an unfair method of competition that the Commission found to be harmful to children and contrary to public policy.

== Background ==
The case involved a challenge to a Federal Trade Commission order prohibiting respondent's use of "break and take" candy packages as an unfair method of competition under § 5 of the Federal Trade Commission Act. The respondent sold candy assortments that used chance-based features, such as hidden cash prizes, concealed price tickets, and prize-winning pieces, to encourage purchases, particularly among children. The FTC found that these packages undermined public policy by encouraging gambling, diverted trade from competing "straight goods" candy manufacturers, and placed competitors who refused to use such methods at a disadvantage.

=== Lower court decision ===
The lower court held that respondent's practice was not an unfair method of competition because it did not hinder competitors, create a monopoly, or deceive consumers. It reasoned that competing manufacturers were free to adopt the same sales method and therefore were not placed at a competitive disadvantage.

== Supreme Court ==
The Court reasoned that the practice affected not only competing manufacturers but also retailers and consumers throughout the penny candy industry. Because the practice was widespread and had far-reaching effects, it was a matter of public concern under § 5 of the Federal Trade Commission Act and turned to whether the practice was unfair within the meaning of the statute. Relying on Federal Trade Commission v. Winsted Hosiery Co., 258 U.S. 483, and Federal Trade Commission v. Algoma Lumber Co., 291 U.S. 67, the Court explained that a practice may be unfair when it forces competitors to either adopt methods they consider improper to avoid losing business. The Court concluded that the chance-based candy packages exploited children and placed pressure on competitors to engage in a practice contrary to public policy, making it an "unfair method of competition" under the Act.

Unlike more specific statutory provisions, § 5 of the Federal Trade Commission Act of 1914 adopts a broad standard prohibiting "unfair methods of competition." Congress intentionally left the term "unfair" undefined, relying on the Federal Trade Commission's expertise to develop its meaning through administration and adjudication. The Court held that the Commission correctly determined that the practice was an "unfair method of competition".

== Subsequent developments ==
FTC v. Sperry & Hutchinson Trading Stamp Co. (1972) cited Keppel as an example of § 5 authority to reach practices pressuring competitors to adopt methods they considered improper, but after appellate courts rejected efforts in the 1980s to expand § 5 further, the FTC largely abandoned independent § 5 theories in litigation.
