= Trading stamp =

Loyalty program token

Gold Bond trading stamps were dispensed in strips at the time of purchase and pasted into books for saving.

Trading stamps are small paper stamps given to customers by merchants in loyalty programs, predating the modern loyalty card-based and online programs. Like similarly-issued retailer coupons, these stamps have only a minimal cash value of a few mils (thousandths of a dollar), but when a customer accumulates a number of them, they can be exchanged through the trading stamp company (usually a third-party issuer of the stamps) for premiums, such as toys, personal items, housewares, furniture and appliances.

Trading stamps were popular in the United States, Canada, and the U.K. from the 1910s to the 1970s, but are no longer used. They are currently in use in Hong Kong.

== History ==
=== Origin ===
The practice of retailers issuing trading stamps started in 1891 at Schuster's Department Store, Wisconsin. At first, the stamps were given only to customers who paid for purchases in cash as a reward for not making purchases on credit. Other retailers soon copied the practice of giving trading stamps that could be redeemed at the issuer's store. One example was L. H. Parke Company a Philadelphia and Pittsburgh manufacturer and distributor of food products that included coffee, tea and spices along with canned goods. They established a trading stamp program in 1895 under the name Parke's Blue Point Trading Stamps for customers who purchased Parke's products in grocery stores in Pennsylvania and New Jersey. The program was successful. Parke established showrooms in their headquarters buildings in Philadelphia and Pittsburgh where customers could inspect and obtain premium goods.

=== Independent trading stamp companies ===
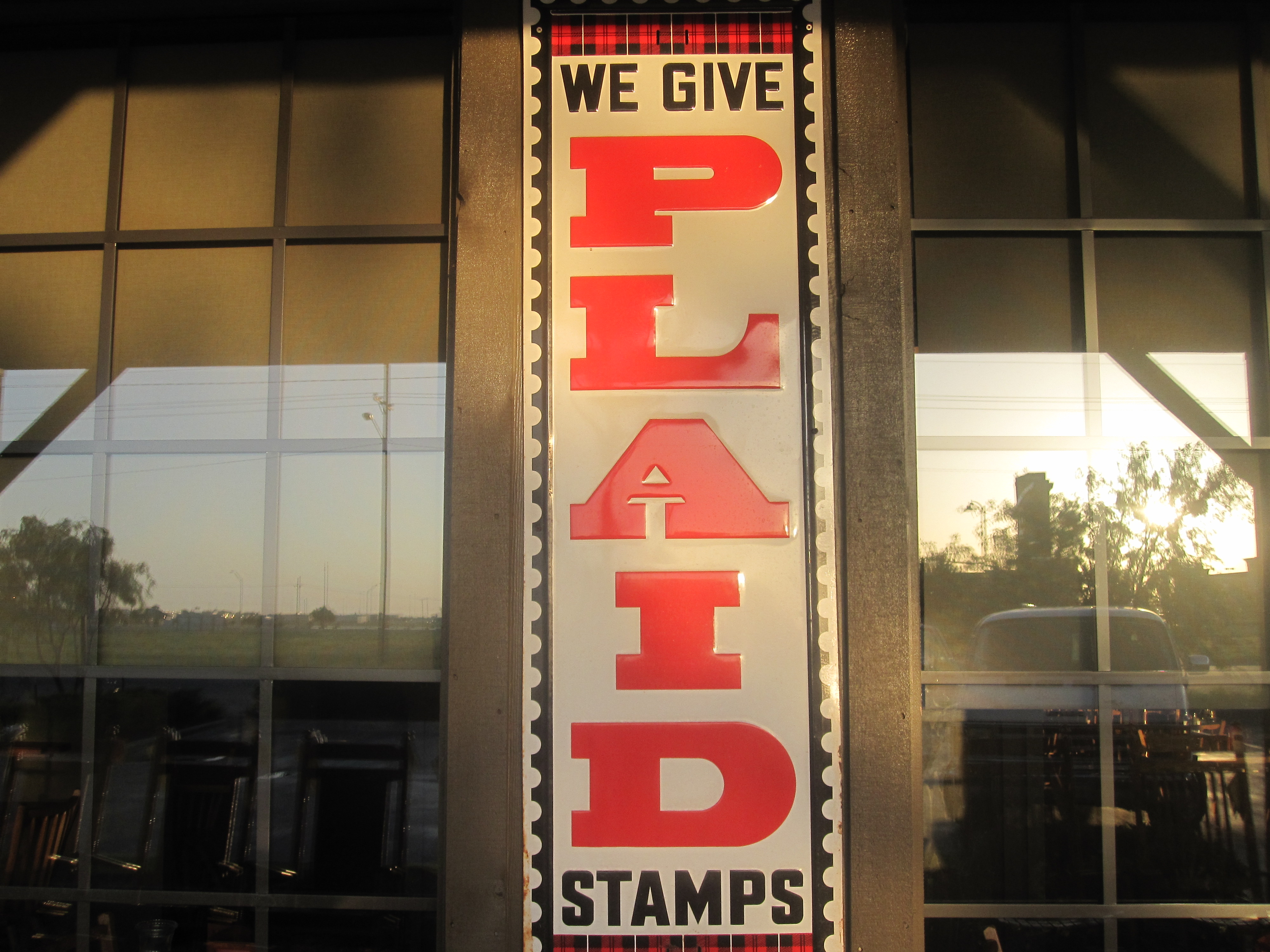
Plaid Stamps sign at Cracker Barrel restaurant in Lubbock, Texas

In 1896, the Sperry and Hutchinson Company was created as an independent trading stamp company in the United States. By 1957, there were approximately 200 trading stamp companies in operation. Typically, merchants would pay a third-party trading stamp company for the stamps, and would then advertise that they give trading stamps with purchases. Large retailers were usually given a discount on the stamps while smaller retailers generally had to pay the full cost of adopting the trading stamp program. The intent was to get customers to be loyal to the merchant, so that they would continue shopping there to obtain enough stamps to redeem for merchandise. Customers would fill books with stamps, and take the books to a trading stamp company redemption center to exchange them for premiums. Books could also be sent to the trading stamp company in exchange for premium merchandise via mail order catalogs. An example of the value of trading stamps would be during the 1970s and 1980s where the typical rate issued by a merchant was one stamp for each 10¢ of merchandise purchased. A typical book took approximately 1200 stamps to fill, representing US $120.00 in purchases.

While one of the most popular brand of trading stamps in the US were S&H Green Stamps, informally known as "green stamps", other large brands included Top Value Stamps, Gold Bond Stamps, Plaid Stamps, Blue Chip Stamps, Quality Stamps, Buccaneer Stamps and Gold Strike Stamps. Texas Gold Stamps were given in Texas mainly by the H-E-B grocery store chain, and Mahalo stamps in Hawaii.

Even the comic-book publisher Marvel Comics entered the trading stamp field in the 1970s, with what were known as "Marvel Value Stamps". Each Value Stamp featured artwork of a Marvel character (the first one featuring Spider-Man), and were generally featured in the letter pages of Marvel titles (with certain titles, primarily reprints, consequently not offering Value Stamps). Buyers were encouraged to clip out the stamps and collect them (this practice was annoying to future comic collectors, with the price of comics declining if they were cut up for their Value Stamps), with Marvel offering a stamp book by mail for 50 cents; if a person managed to collect all 100 stamps in a book (the 100th Stamp was kept a mystery until it was featured in Sub-Mariner #72, featuring the image of Galactus), they were entitled to discounts at comic book shops and conventions (including San Diego Comic-Con). A further series of stamps were released known as "Series B", which in lieu of singular stamps featuring only one character, were instead akin to a jigsaw puzzle; when put together, the stamps would create an entire image, typically of a Marvel star (or in one case, Stan Lee himself). The concept was revived in 2006 for a run of stamps in Marvel Spotlight, and again in 2017 as part of the Marvel Legacy initiative.

=== Growth and decline ===
The use of trading stamps grew with the spread of chain gasoline stations in the early 1910s and the then-new industry of chain supermarkets in the 1920s. Merchants found it more profitable to award them to all customers rather than cash only customers. Legal challenges regarding the use of trading stamps were raised in various jurisdictions around the US, but were often struck down. Some merchant groups disliked trading stamps and actively worked to have them banned in their areas. Following World War II, the use of trading stamps expanded when supermarkets began issuing them. By 1957, it was estimated that nearly 250,000 retail outlets were issuing trading stamps, with nearly two thirds of US households saving them. During this time, trading stamp companies had between 1,400 - 1,600 retail centers where consumers could redeem their stamps for consumer goods. In the early 1960s, the S&H Green Stamps company boasted that it printed more stamps annually than the number of postage stamps printed by the US government. In 1968, it was reported that more than $900 million in stamps were sold in the United States.

Use of trading stamps began to decline in the early 1970s. Gasoline service stations stopped offering them because of the energy crisis, and many supermarkets started advertising lower prices instead of issuing stamps. During the 1980s, there was a brief resurgence in popularity, but overall, use continued to decline. Trading stamps have been replaced by coupons, rewards programs offered by credit card issuers, and other loyalty programs such as grocery "Preferred Customer" cards. Through the 1990s and early 2000s, the majority of the remaining trading stamp companies either ceased operations or converted to an online format. In 2008, the last operating trading stamp company in the United States, Eagle Stamps, closed.

=== Outside the United States ===
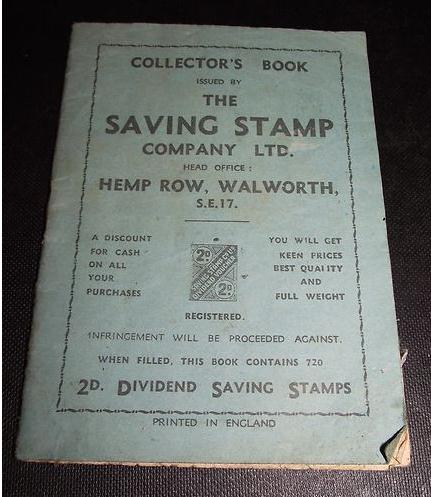
A British trading stamp collecting book from the mid twentieth century.

==== Canada ====
The use of trading stamps began in Canada circa 1900 but their use was banned by the Canadian government in 1905. In 1959 the grocery chain Loblaws introduced their Lucky Green Stamps program and a trading stamp program was started by an IGA grocery store in Winnipeg. Although faced with legal challenges the use of trading stamps in these instances was upheld as legal since they did not meet the definition of trading stamps in the Canadian Criminal Code. The Criminal Code provisions against trading stamps were deleted, among other obsolete provisions, by Bill C-51, passed in 2018.

==== United Kingdom ====
By the 1960s the use of trading stamps had spread to the United Kingdom. Entrepreneur Richard Tompkins established Green Shield Stamps in the United Kingdom. Although based along a similar model, the Green Shield Stamps were independent of S&H Green Stamps but carried a similar trademark. Tompkins' company began selling stamps to filling stations, small retailers and had signed up the Tesco supermarket chain to the Green Shield Stamp franchise in 1963. The S&H Company began offering their stamps in the United Kingdom as well but with the color changed to pink. In 1965, the British co-operative movement began offering trading stamps as a new means of allocating patronage dividends to its consumer members.

==== Hong Kong ====
Trading stamps are currently in use in Hong Kong.

== See also ==
- Big Bear Stores - chain of supermarkets with their own trading stamp program called "Buckeye Stamps".
- Blue Chip Stamps - US company that produced trading stamps.
- Carlson Companies - originally Gold Bond Stamp Company, issuer of Gold Bond Trading Stamps.
- Green Shield Stamps - first trading stamps issued in UK.
- S&H Green Stamps - US company that produced trading stamps.
- Thomas Sperry - co-founder of S&H Green Stamps.
- Two Guys - a chain of stores that issued its own trading stamps program.
- Federal Trade Commission v. Sperry & Hutchinson Trading Stamp Co.
- Canadian Tire money - a similar system at Canadian Tire stores in Canada, using scrip instead of stamps.

== References and sources ==
Sources

- Campbell, Scott (9 June 1981). "Licked Again: The Life and Times of Trading Stamps". The Boston Phoenix.
- Cunniff, John (February 8, 1974). "Trading stamp use falls". St. Petersburg Times. p. 17-A.
- Lonto, Jeff R. (2004c). "THE TRADING STAMP STORY (or When Trading Stamps Stuck) Part 3". STUDIO Z•7 PUBLISHING. Archived from the original on 2011-07-16.
