= S&H Green Stamps (Warhol) =

1962 painting by Andy Warhol

- 64 S&H Green Stamps
- Artist: Andy Warhol
- Year: 1962
- Medium: Acrylic and pencil on linen
- Movement: Pop Art
- Dimensions: 50.8 cm × 40.6 cm (20 in × 16 in)

S&H Green Stamps (64 S&H Green Stamps) is a 1962 painting by American artist Andy Warhol. The work depicts a grid of trading stamps issued by the Sperry & Hutchinson company (S&H). It is considered an early example of Warhol's use of serial imagery and a precursor to his later silkscreen paintings that would define much of his later work.

S&H Green Stamps belongs to a small group of paintings produced in 1962. Warhol later returned to the subject in 1965 for his S&H Green Stamps photolithograph.

== Background ==
After graduating from the Carnegie Institute of Technology in 1949, Andy Warhol moved to New York City and became a successful commercial illustrator, producing a prolific body of advertisements throughout the 1950s. In the early 1960s, Warhol began creating paintings based on images drawn from mass culture, including comic strips and newspaper advertisements. By 1962, he had turned to transforming everyday consumer goods into large-scale paintings such as Campbell's Soup cans, dollar bills, and Coca-Cola bottles.

The S&H Green Stamps paintings were produced the same time Warhol completed his Campbell's Soup Cans series. They are among the first works in which Warhol systematically repeated a single image across a canvas, establishing the seriality that became a defining feature of his Pop art.

Warhol's interest in S&H Green Stamps stemmed from his mother, Julia Warhola, who was a collector and often had him help paste them into redemption booklets.

In 1965, Warhol returned to the subject, producing the S&H Green Stamps photolithograph.

== Technique and production ==
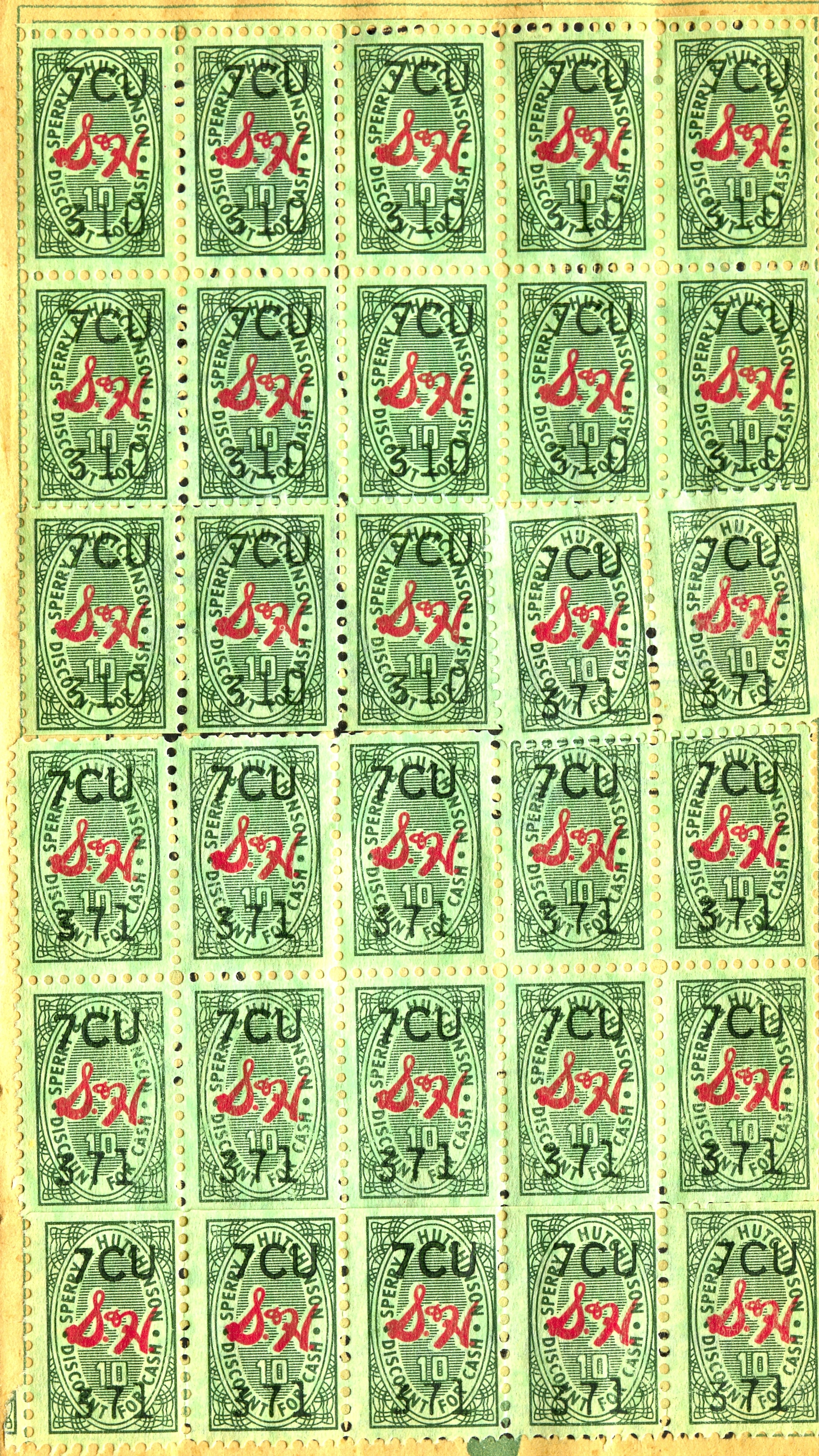
S&H Green Stamps pasted onto a collection page

The S&H Green Stamps paintings were produced using a stamping method. He initially experimented by repeating a single image in a grid with stencils before using rubber stamps. The stamps sped up production, particularly for rendering typography, while reducing the artist's hand so the images appeared mechanically produced.

Assisted by Nathan Gluck, Warhol carved art-gum erasers with enlarged images of S&H Green Stamps and seven-cent Airmail stamps and used them to imprint rows of identical motifs on canvas, a technique he had employed in the late 1950s. Gluck later recalled:

Andy wanted to reproduce things, and rather than have rubber stamps made, he thought maybe we could carve things in balsa wood. Well that was too much of a chore. I think maybe we did a Coke Bottle with balsa wood, and we discovered soap erasers. You know, art gum … an eraser that comes in a cubular form. It's brown like octagon soap, like laundry soap, and it usually comes in two by two by three. We discovered one place once that had it in flat surfaces with four inch square and about an inch and a half thick. … All the stamps were made from soap eraser. … I made the S&H stamps out of a soap eraser.

This process anticipated Warhol's adoption of silkscreen printing later in 1962, when he began tracing photographic images directly onto canvas. The S&H Green Stamps paintings are among the last of his Pop paintings to be largely hand-painted.

== Description ==
Measuring approximately 20 × 16 inches (50.8 × 40.6 cm), S&H Green Stamps, consists of 64 stamped images in eight rows of eight, with the top and bottom rows partially cropped by the composition. The hand-carved process is evident in the irregular lettering. The painting required two separate stamps, one for each color, to create layered color, to produce the layered red-and-green pattern of repeated motifs.

== Exhibitions ==
S&H Green Stamps debuted in the landmark exhibition New Painting of Common Objects at the Pasadena Art Museum in Pasadena, California, from September to October 1962. Subsequent exhibitions included Selections from the L.M. Asher Family Collection at the Art Gallery in Albuquerque in January–February 1964; 3 Pop Artists at the University of California, Riverside Art Gallery, in February 1972; and Andy Warhol: A Retrospective, presented at the Museum of Modern Art in New York from February to May 1989 and at the Hayward Gallery in London from June to September 1990.

== Critical reception ==
In a review in Artforum, art critic John Coplans wrote that Warhol regarded his work as "a kind of portraiture," suggesting that the repeated forms highlight how similar people are, "how all that changes is the name." Discussing S&H Green Stamps, Coplans noted that the painting evokes "a hive of grey flannel clerks, all identically clothed, all working for a pay check, to be spent on identical goods in identical supermarts to get identical stamps to redeem them for identical goods to be put in identical homes and be shared with stereotyped wives."

The Los Angeles Times art critic Henry J. Seldis was dismissive of the exhibition New Painting of Common Objects at the Pasadena Art Museum, writing that "Andy Warhol, of local Campbell Soup fame, is no more inspiring when he paints trading stamps. Most of us would still prefer the real thing." In contrast, Heloise Welch of the Independent Star-News described the exhibition as a refreshing alternative to Abstract expressionism, characterizing the works as "a form of protest" whose humor derived both from the satirical choice of everyday objects—such as Green Stamps, a slice of pie, and a can of Spam—but in the "smirking disregard for the techniques usually employed by the so-called artisans in this field."

== Variations ==
In the 1960s, Warhol created multiple variations of S&H Green Stamps. His early S&H Green Stamps from 1962, which include S&H Green Stamps (64 S&H Green Stamps), 70 S&H Green Stamps, 12 S&H Green Stamps, and a large S&H Green Stamps.

S&H Green Stamps, measuring 71 3/4 × 53 3/4 inches (182.2 × 136.5 cm), was in the collection of Philip Johnson, who gifted it to the Museum of Modern Art in New York.

70 S&H Green Stamps, measuring 16 1/8 × 20 1/4 inches (41 × 51.4 cm), and 12 S&H Green Stamps were acquired by Burton and Emily Hall Tremaine in 1962. 70 S&H Green Stamps was later in the collection of Martin and Janet Blinder.

The 1962 works were made using hand-carved rubber stamps from art gum erasers, while the S&H Green Stamps photolithograph in 1965 were based on a photograph of an original sheet, resulting in a more precise gridded image.

The 1965 prints was published to coincide with Warhol's first retrospective at the Institute of Contemporary Art, Philadelphia (ICA). Around 300 impressions were produced as exhibition posters and sold for $15, with proceeds supporting the catalogue. Some of these were signed and dated by ICA director Samuel Adams Green. For the exhibition, 100 prints were displayed as wallpaper, including a grid of 49 works arranged seven by seven, extending across walls and swinging doors. S&H Green Stamps was also produced in a large edition of 6,000 as a folded exhibition announcement mailer.

== Auction history ==
In May 2006, S&H Green Stamps (64 S&H Green Stamps) sold from the collection of Betty Asher for $5.1 million at Christie's Post War and Contemporary Evening Sale in New York.
