= Sperry (surname) =

Sperry is a surname. Notable people with the surname include:

- Armstrong Sperry (1897–1976), American author and illustrator
- Brett Sperry (contemporary), American video game designer
- Carlos A. Sperry, Democratic President of the West Virginia Senate from Greenbrier County, served 1872–1872
- Charles Stillman Sperry (1847–1911), an officer in the United States Navy
- Chris Sperry (born 1965), American college baseball coach
- Elmer Ambrose Sperry (1860–1930), American inventor and entrepreneur, founder of Sperry Gyroscope Company, father of Lawrence Sperry
- E. Frank Sperry (1843–1916), Mayor of Orlando
- James Sperry (1910–1997), English cricketer
- John Sperry (1924–2012), Anglican Bishop
- Joseph Evans Sperry (1854–1930), American architect
- Kevin Sperry (born 2006), American football player
- Lawrence Sperry (1892–c. 1923), American aviation pioneer, son of Elmer Ambrose Sperry
- Lewis Sperry (1848–1922), United States Representative from Connecticut
- Mário Sperry (born 1966), Brazilian martial artist
- Nehemiah D. Sperry (1827–1911), United States Representative from Connecticut
- Neil Sperry, Texas gardening and horticulture expert
- Paul A. Sperry (1895–1982), American inventor and businessman, founder of Sperry Top-Sider
- Roger Wolcott Sperry (1913–1994), American neurobiologist, psychologist and Nobel laureate
- Thomas Sperry (c. 1864 – 1913), American businessman and co-founder of S&H Green Stamps
- William Miller Sperry, namesake of William Miller Sperry Observatory, brother of Thomas Sperry
