= BeatThatQuote.com =

British price comparison website

BeatThatQuote.com was a British price comparison site specializing in personal finance products. The site was disabled in 2013 after being acquired by Google.

== History ==
BeatThatQuote.com was launched by John Paleomylites in February 2005 based in London's Kentish Town. In the financial year 2006 to 2007 the company posted revenues of £7.8 million.

BeatThatQuote.com was ranked by Nielsen Online as the fastest growing UK website in 2007, was acquired by Google in March 2011 for £37.7 million. BeatThatQuote.com was penalised by Google for search engine spamming the day after it acquired it.

In turn, Google created Google Compare using some of the technology that they had acquired. However, this was not a success and it was closed in March 2016.

== Affiliations ==
As well as operating their own website, BeatThatQuote.com also provided the services for other comparison websites such as ArgosCompare.co.uk and other financial comparison websites.

== See also ==
- Confused.com
- Go.Compare
- Money.co.uk
- Moneyfacts.co.uk
