= Blue Chip Stamps =

Trading stamps company

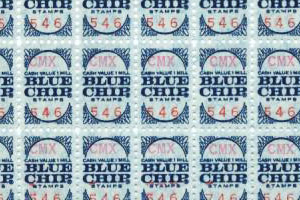
A sheet of Blue Chip Stamps

Blue Chip Stamps started as a trading stamps company called "Blue Chip Stamp Company." They were a competitor of S&H Green Stamps. Blue Chip stamps were a loyalty program for customers, similar to discount cards issued by pharmacies and grocery stores in the digital era. A customer making a purchase at a participating store (typically grocery stores, gasoline stations, and pharmacy chains) would be given stamps in proportion to the dollar amount of the purchase. The stamps were dispensed by machines adjacent to the cash register. The customer would paste the stamps (which could be moistened like postage stamps) into books. The books could then be taken to a redemption center and redeemed for merchandise, such as lawn furniture, dining tables, tableware, and many other items. The redemption centers did not maintain a full inventory of items but would order from a catalog on behalf of the customer.

The loyalty program was funded through the overall pricing of goods in the participating retailers. The recession of 1980 and cost cutting caused the program to lose popularity, and the growth of credit card transactions competed for retail margins. As computerization developed, less-cumbersome loyalty programs were developed. These programs required less of a customer's time and had lower operational costs. They did not require physical locations for redemption, and the discounts often were restricted to the products offered by the participating stores, i.e., the participating stores were discounting merchandise that they would keep in stock even without the reward program.

== History and background ==
In 1963, the United States government began an antitrust action against Blue Chip Stamp. In 1967, the parties agreed to a consent decree which led to the creation of a new company "Blue Chip Stamps".

In 1975, a lawsuit filed by Blue Chip Stamps was decided by the Supreme Court in the opinion Blue Chip Stamps v. Manor Drug Stores. This ruling helped establish the precedent that only buyers or sellers of securities can file suit for damages due to deceptive practices.

Berkshire Hathaway, the investment vehicle of Warren Buffett, began investing in Blue Chip Stamps in 1970. At year-end 1972 it owned 19%, at year-end 1973 22.5%. Berkshire's investment in Blue Chip went from 36.5 percent in 1977 to 60 percent in 1979 and finally merged in a stock swap in 1983.

According to Buffett's 2006 letter to Berkshire shareholders, Blue Chip had 1970 sales of US$126 million as about 60 billion "stamps were licked by savers, pasted into books, and taken to Blue Chip redemption stores." He also said, "When I was told that even certain brothels and mortuaries gave stamps to their patrons, I felt I had finally found a sure thing." Sales dropped to $19.4 million in 1980 and $1.5 million in 1990. In 2006, revenues came in at $25,920.

== Acquisitions ==
On January 3, 1972, Blue Chip obtained a controlling interest in See's Candies. Blue Chip later acquired 100 percent of See's for an overall price of $25 million.

Wesco Financial Corporation was an 80.1 percent owned subsidiary of Blue Chip Stamps until its complete merger into Berkshire Hathaway in 2011.

== Redemption ==
The Blue Chip Stamp Company still exists (as of February, 2024) and is located in Pasadena, California. They can be redeemed at the value of $1.80 per full book.

== See also ==
S&H Green Stamps
