= Tu (clothing) =

Supermarket clothing brand

- Sainsburys Tu clothing at a supermarket
- Industry: Fashion
- Founded: 2004
- Number of locations: 400+
- Owner: Sainsbury's
- Parent: Sainsbury's
- Website: tuclothing.sainsburys.co.uk

Tu is a British home brand fashion label owned by Sainsbury's. It is the United Kingdom's third largest online clothing retailer and the United Kingdom's sixth largest clothing retailer by volume.

Tu sells a wide range of clothing for men, women and children, with 3,000 lines sold through 400 Sainsbury's supermarkets.

== Timeline ==
The Tu brand was founded in 2004 by Sainsbury's as a replacement for the Jeff & Co range designed by Jeff Banks. The new brand included a line of childrenswear created by Adams. It was initially launched in 160 stores. The original range included both clothing under the "TU" brand and homewares under the brand "TU Home".

In 2011, Sainsbury's entered into a partnership with the television clothing guru Gok Wan to design a new clothing range.

In 2013, Sainsbury's relaunched the Tu brand, concentrating it entirely on clothing, with the homewares re-branded under the core "by Sainsbury's" brand (the Sainsbury's homewares range is now branded as Habitat as of 2021). The logo was also changed, from all uppercase letters to a capital "T" and a lowercase "u", to emphasise that the brand is pronounced like "two" and not "tea you".

In 2015, Sainsbury's set up a dedicated website, tuclothing.sainsburys.co.uk (branded as Tu.co.uk), to sell the product range nationwide to a much bigger audience.

Following Sainsbury's acquisition of Argos in 2016, Sainsbury's started selling Tu clothing on the Argos website in 2018.
