= Richard Tompkins =

British entrepreneur (1918–1992)

Richard Tompkins CBE
- Born: Granville Richard Francis Tompkins; 15 May 1918; Islington, London, England
- Died: 6 December 1992 (aged 74); Westminster, London, England
- Occupation: Entrepreneur
- Years active: 1945–1992
- Known for: Founder of Green Shield Stamps and Argos

Granville Richard Francis Tompkins CBE (15 May 1918 – 6 December 1992) was a British print, advertising and retail entrepreneur, best known for founding the Green Shield Stamps company, as well as the Argos chain of catalogue stores which became one of the largest retailers in the United Kingdom, and a constituent of the FTSE 100 Index.

== Career ==
Richard Tompkins was born in Islington, north London, and worked as an engineering draughtsman during the Second World War, before founding his first printing business in 1945.

On holiday in Chicago in the 1950s, Tompkins witnessed the success of S&H Green Stamps, and on his return founded the Green Shield Stamp Trading Company in the United Kingdom.

In 1973, he adapted the format of his Green Shield catalogue shops, used for redeeming trading stamp books, and founded Argos, a catalogue store chain that took cash. Though independent, Argos operations were closely linked to Green Shield Stamps, and Argos was sold in 1979 to BAT Industries for £35 million.

Tompkins was appointed a Commander of the Order of the British Empire (CBE) in the 1992 Birthday Honours. He died later in the year.
