= Argos (retailer) =

British catalogue retailer

Argos Limited
- Type: Subsidiary
- Industry: Retail
- Founded: 1972; 54 years ago
- Founder: Richard Tompkins
- Headquarters: London, England
- Number of locations: 664 (2025)
- Area served: United Kingdom; Ireland (formerly); China (formerly); India (formerly)
- Key people: Simon Roberts (CEO)
- Products: Consumer goods
- Brands: Bush; Chad Valley; Habitat; Tu
- Revenue: ▲£4.23 billion (2024)
- Operating income: ▲£38.6 million (2024)
- Owner: Sainsbury's (sale pending)
- Number of employees: 14,000 (2026)
- Parent: Tumblecrest 2 Limited (the new name of Argos Holdings Limited)
- Website: argos.co.uk

Argos Limited is a British retailer founded in 1972 by Richard Tompkins. Tompkins established Argos by evolving his existing Green Shield Stamps concept. Argos retained Green Shield Stamps' catalogue-store model, where customers browse from a book rather than from shelves.

In 1979, Argos was acquired by BAT Industries. Over the years, it became a prominent trader in toys, jewellery, electronics, and home furnishings. In 1996, Argos expanded into Ireland. In 1998, Argos was acquired by the GUS plc conglomerate and expanded to reach a peak of 800 standalone stores. GUS was later spun-off to form Home Retail Group, with Argos as its flagship retailer. From 2007 to 2009, Argos traded in India, and from 2011 to 2013, Argos traded in China.

In 2016, Home Retail Group (including Argos) was acquired by Sainsbury's, which introduced Argos in its main stores and created Argos Collection Points in Sainsbury's Local shops. Since then, many Argos shops have closed, the print catalogue has been discontinued in favour of its consumer website, and the company has integrated tablets within its stores. In June 2023, Argos exited the Irish market due to poor trading conditions and high costs.

In 2026, it was announced that Sainsbury's had agreed to sell Argos to Swift Partners for £120 million, at which point there were 667 locations, with 201 operating as standalone stores.

== History ==
=== Origins and establishment, 1973–2014 ===
Former Argos logo, used between 1999 and 2010

The company was founded by Richard Tompkins, who had previously established Green Shield Stamps, a concept where people could purchase goods from his "Green Shield Gift House" with cash rather than savings stamps. Green Shield Stamps was rebranded as Argos, in July 1973, the first purpose-built shop opening on the A28 Sturry Road, Canterbury, in late 1973.

Argos achieved revenues of £1 million in a week, for the first time, in November 1975. Argos was purchased by BAT in 1979 for £32 million. That year the company had achieved turnover of over £100 million. The company was demerged from BAT and listed on the London Stock Exchange in 1990.

Argos entered the Irish market in 1996. In April 1998, the company was acquired by GUS plc for £1.9 billion, the result of a hostile takeover. A few months later, after a brief leadership stint under Stuart Rose, Terry Duddy became the new chief executive of Argos, serving in the role until 2014.

In May 2002, Argos along with retailer Littlewoods Index, was accused by the Office of Fair Trading of price fixing goods from toy manufacturer Hasbro. In 2003 Argos were fined £17.28 million, reduced to £15 million after an appeal in 2005. The Court of Appeal dismissed a further appeal in October 2006.

In July 2002, Argos dismissed several workers in Scotland for refusing to work on Sundays. This action was illegal in the rest of the United Kingdom, due to the Sunday Trading Act 1994 which did not apply in Scotland. Argos later retracted its decision and ceased enforcing a Sunday working clause in Scottish employee contracts, and this led to the passing of the Sunday Working (Scotland) Act 2003.

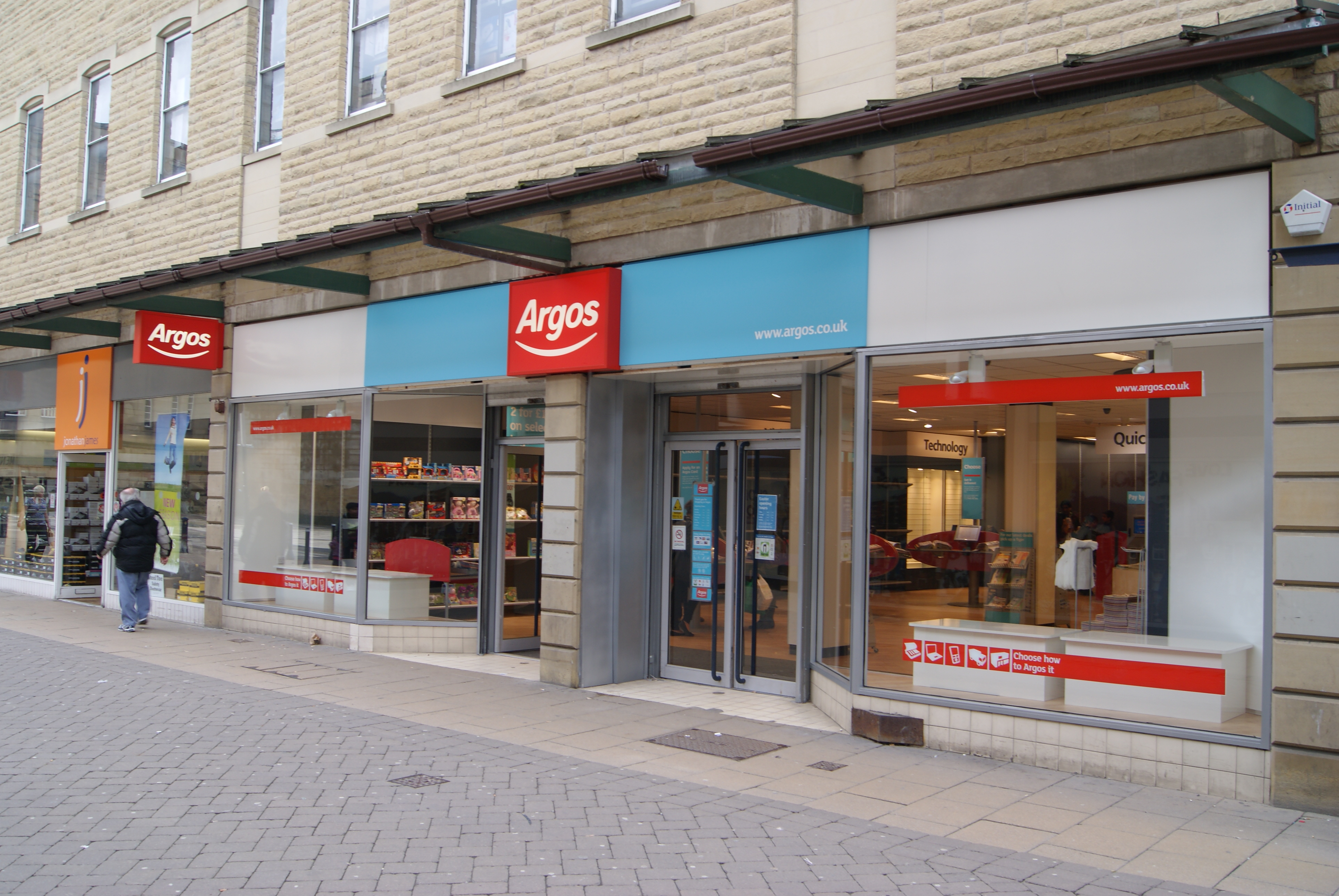
Argos branch in Huddersfield, West Yorkshire

In October 2006, Argos became part of Home Retail Group which was demerged from GUS plc on 11 October 2006.

In February 2007, Argos opened five shops in Mumbai, India. Argos had a franchise agreement, run in conjunction with HyperCity; its Indian retail partner. In January 2009, Argos closed all its shops in India owing to poor sales.

In 2008, sofas from retailers including Argos were featured on BBC Watchdog due to them causing health reactions. The sofas were manufactured by Chinese company LinkWise. Argos had to compensate customers impacted, after a group of consumers look legal action. The cause was a sachet, inside the sofas, of fungicidal chemical dimethyl fumarate, used to prevent mould.

Following the collapse of Woolworth's, Argos acquired brands including Alba, Bush, and Chad Valley, in 2009.

Argos profits were declining in 2011 to 2012. As a result, Argos announced in October 2012 that they would close some of their stores and increase focus on digital retailing.

Argos teamed up with Barnardo's in a six-week campaign in the run-up to Christmas 2012 that raised £700,000 for the children's charity. Customers brought in unwanted toys to Argos or Barnado's shops in return for £5 Argos vouchers. Argos gave the unwanted toys to Barnado's to sell in the charity's own chain of shops.

=== 2015–2024 ===
In January 2015, Argos took over the rights to sell the Cherokee clothing line from Tesco; however, this was phased out in 2017 in favour of Sainsbury's own Tu brand of clothing.

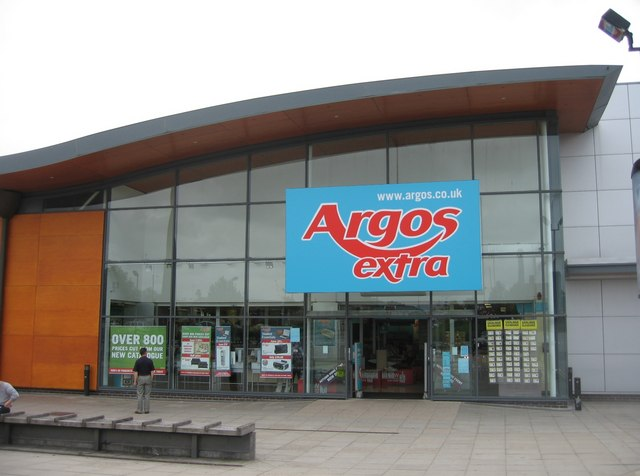
Argos Extra shop in Cambridge in 2008. The 'Extra' brand was phased out in 2010. As of November 2026, some stores still use the Extra brand.

On 2 September 2016 Argos' parent Home Retail Group was acquired by Sainsbury's for £1.4 billion following a bidding war between the supermarket chain and South African conglomerate Steinhoff International.

In 2019, Sainsbury's closed about 70 Argos free-standing stores,and included 80 Argos branches in Sainsbury's supermarkets. In 2020 the printed catalogue was discontinued; orders were made using an online catalog or digital displays in store. Up to ten million copies of each catalogue had been printed over its 93-edition existence. On 5 November 2020, Sainsbury's announced it would close 420 Argos standalone outlets by March 2024, together with other measures that included 3,500 job losses across Sainsbury's, to save £600 million. John Colley, associate dean of Warwick Business School, commented that the closures were an admission that Sainsbury's purchase of Argos had been a mistake; however integrating Argos into Sainsbury's stores had been planned from the outset of the acquisition.

On 24 June 2023, Argos ceased its operations in Ireland, due to challenging trading conditions, high rents and because the investment required to modernise the business in Ireland was considered unviable. In the same month Argos closed its head office on Avebury Boulevard, Milton Keynes, and moved their registered office to Sainsbury's head office in Holborn, London.

In 2024, Argos disposed of Argos Financial Services, for around £720m.

=== Since 2025 ===
On 13 September 2025, Sainsbury's held negotiations for the sale of Argos to Chinese online retailer JD.com, stating that "JD.com would bring world-class retail, technology and logistics expertise and invest to drive Argos' growth and further transform the customer experience", but that "no agreement has been reached". A day later, it abandoned the sale.

On 31 July 2026, Sainsbury's announced it would sell Argos to newly created firm Swift Partners for £120m, with the sale expected to complete in February 2027. Sainsbury's, together with the new owners of Argos, stated the intention to retain an in-store presence in Sainsbury's supermarkets, and to continue using the Nectar loyalty programme. Sainsbury's would continue to sell Argos-branded products such as Habitat. Richard Pennycook would serve as chairman and head up the nearly 14,000 of existing Argos staff who would be transferred to Swift Partners upon completion, as part of the purchase.

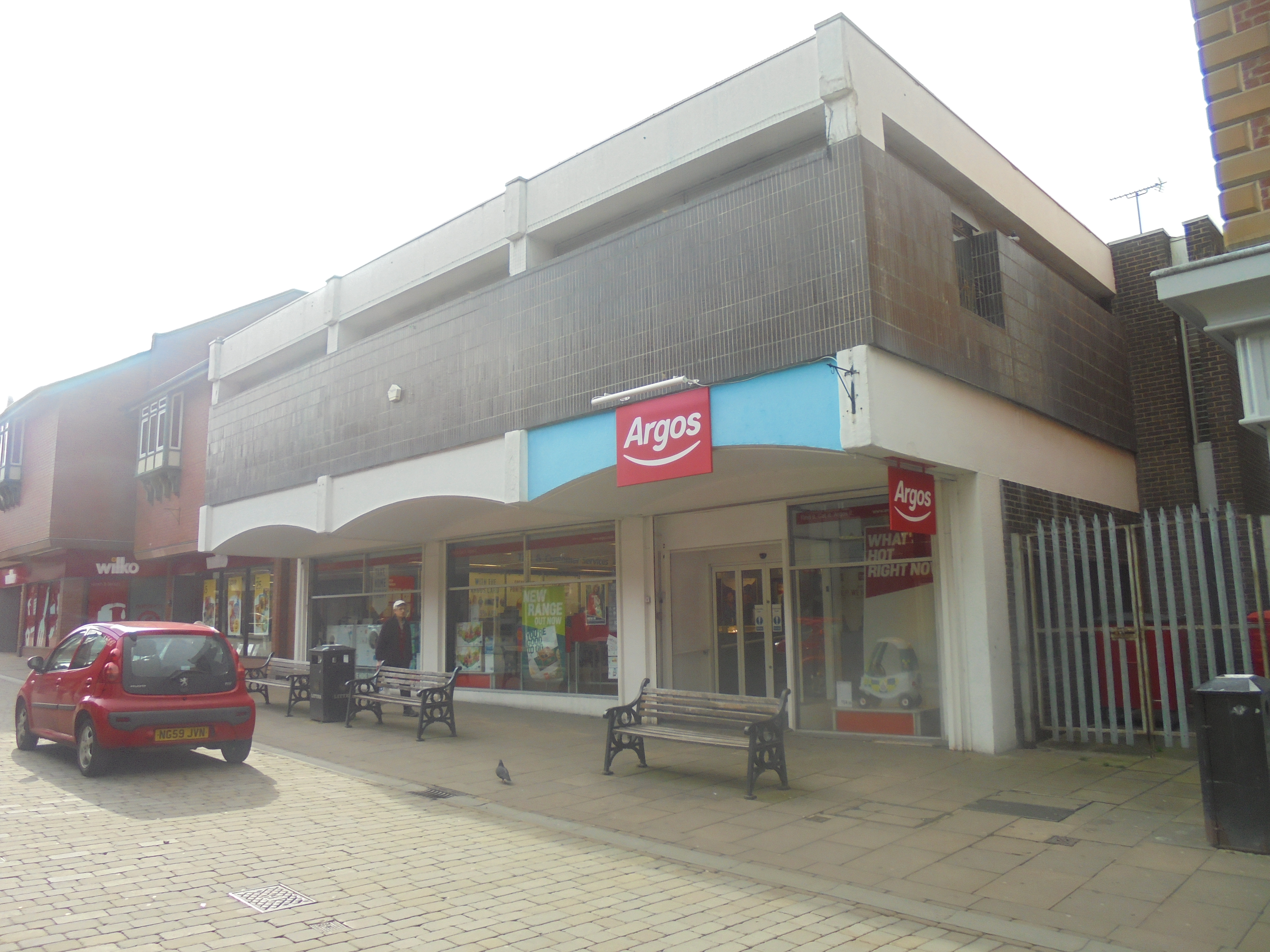
An Argos branch in Pontefract, West Yorkshire.

== Past projects ==
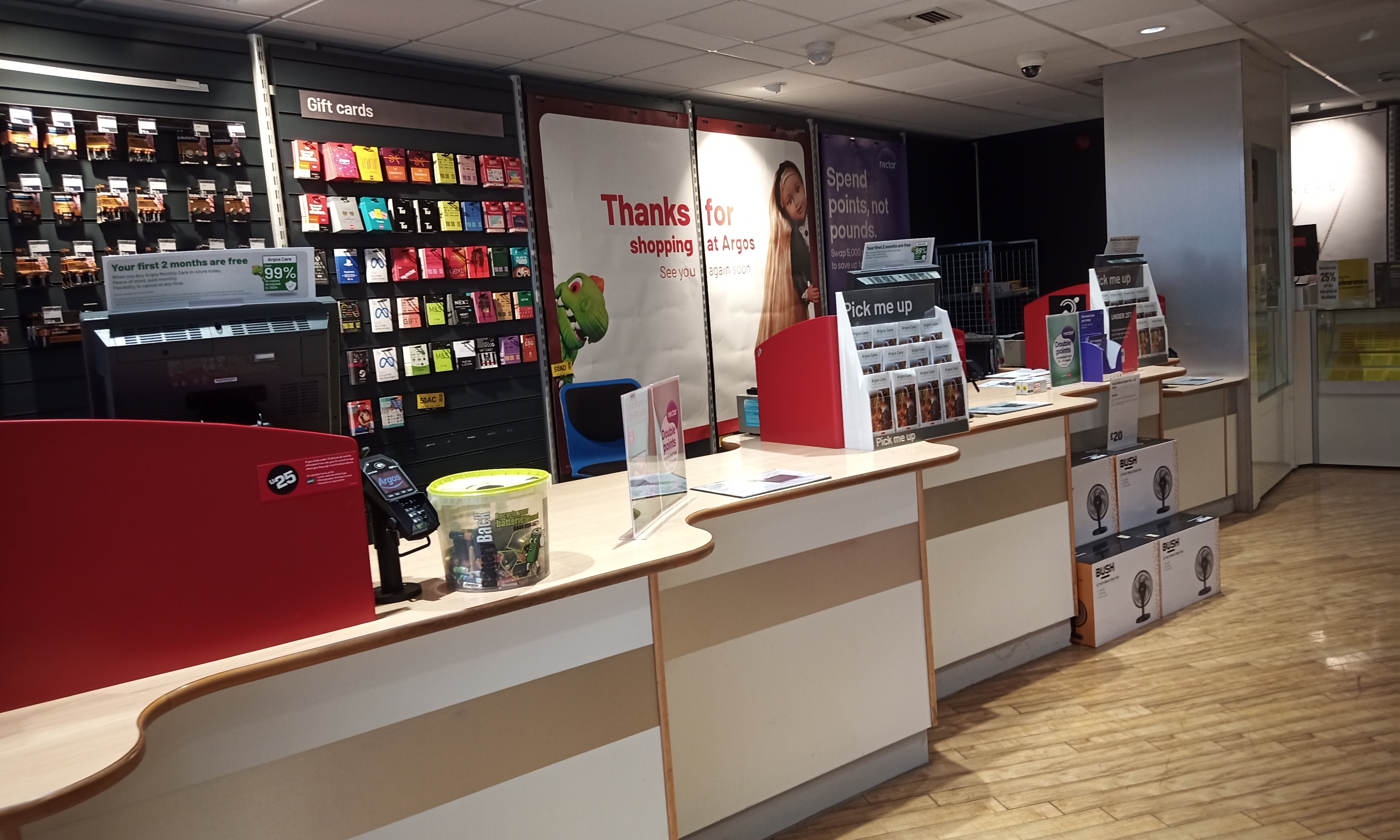
Interior of Argos in Pontefract in 2025

=== ArgosCompare ===
Argos operated a financial services price comparison website, in conjunction with BeatThatQuote.com. In January 2012, ArgosCompare was taken offline, as it did not comply with new guidance issued by the UK Financial Service Authority.

=== Argos Credit Card ===
In August 2006, Barclays and Argos announced a joint venture to produce an Argos Credit Card. In 2024, Sainsbury's agreed a deal to divest the Argos credit card business to NewDay for £720 million.

=== ArgosTV ===
On 15 June 2011, ArgosTV was launched on Sky channel 642. From October 2011 it was available on Freesat, on channel 819. On 19 September 2012, ArgosTV launched on Freeview, on channel 55 for a limited set of hours. ArgosTV was discontinued in 2013.
