= Green Shield Stamps =

British sales promotion scheme

Green Shield Trading Stamp Company
- Industry: Trading stamps
- Founded: 1958
- Founder: Richard Tompkins
- Defunct: 1991 (original company) 2002 (company)
- Fate: Ceased trading
- Headquarters: United Kingdom
- Key people: Richard Tompkins and Joe Phillips; Founding chairman and managing directors

A typical Green Shield stamp.

Green Shield Stamps was a British sales promotion scheme that rewarded shoppers with stamps that could be used to buy gifts from a catalogue or from any affiliated retailer. The scheme was introduced in 1958 by Richard Tompkins, who had noticed the success of the long-established Sperry & Hutchinson Green Stamps in America.

For just a few years, the scheme was so widely adopted that it was referenced in rock songs. But it suffered when Tesco ceased to use it, as part of a price-cutting policy that became standard nationwide. To retain business, Green Shield allowed customers to buy gifts from the catalogue with a mix of stamps and cash, but soon the catalogue became cash-only, and the operation was re-branded as Argos. Stamps were withdrawn altogether in 1991 and the company entered voluntary liquidation in 2002.

== History ==
Trading stamps first became popular in the United States. Sperry & Hutchinson began offering stamps to United States retailers in 1896. The retailers bought stamps from S&H and gave them as bonuses with every purchase based on the amount purchased. The stamps were given away at filling stations, corner shops and supermarkets. When the customer had collected sufficient stamps in collectors' books, the shopper claimed merchandise from a catalogue or S&H Green Stamps shop.

Richard Tompkins purchased the name Green Shield from a luggage manufacturer and founded Green Shield Trading Stamp Co in 1958, along similar lines to S&H Green Stamps. They were popular during the 1960s and 1970s. Competing trading stamp schemes included Pink Stamps (a UK operation of S&H Green Stamps), British consumer co-operatives' dividend stamps, Blue Chip and the short-lived UK operation of King Korn.

In the early 1960s, Green Shield built a new headquarters office block in Station Road, Edgware, Middlesex (a suburb on the north-west London fringe). With the end of Green Shield Stamps, the block was renamed Premier House.

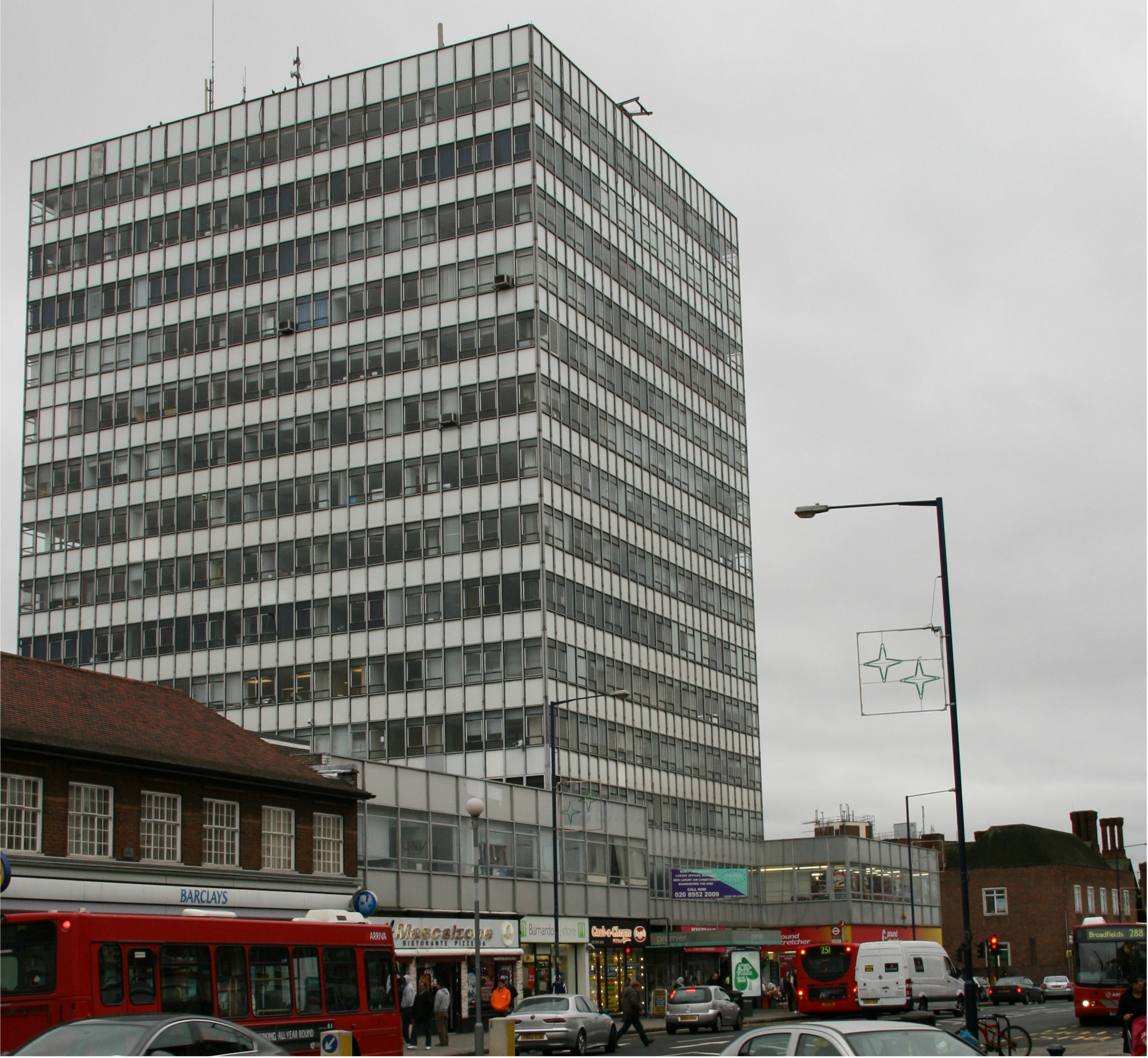
Premier House

Tesco founder Jack Cohen was an advocate of stamps; he signed up in 1963, shortly after his competitor Fine Fare adopted S&H Pink Stamps, and Tesco became one of the company's largest clients. But Cohen was a fan of pile it high and sell it cheap, and in the mid-1970s Tesco faced cost problems associated with not integrating its stores. In 1977 Tesco launched Operation Checkout, price-cutting aimed at countering the new discounters such as Kwik Save. A decision was made to abandon Green Shield stamps, saving £20m a year and helping to finance price reductions.

In the context of a price war, and higher prices where the stamps were sold, consumers prices were rising to cover costs – and as inflation was high, the value of the stamps was going down. On the high street the main suppliers of Green Shield stamps became the filling stations. Aimed at company drivers, who didn't care about the cost of fuel, competing stations began to offer double, triple, quadruple and even greater multiples of stamps. As sales slowed and other retailers abandoned the scheme, Green Shield Stamp catalogue shops began to offer part stamp-redemption and part cash for the goods in their catalogue. The proportion of cash accepted was slowly increased until the goods could be purchased, outright, without the need for any stamps. With this groundwork laid, the catalogue stores, warehouses and vehicle fleet were rebranded Argos in July 1973. The company suspended sale of stamps in 1983, then had a short revival in 1987 involving 2,500 shops, finally ceasing in 1991.

As well as stamps on purchases, some amusement arcades had fruit machines that paid out in Green Shield Stamps, rather than cash.

== Green Shield Stamp issue value ==
One stamp was typically issued for each 6d (2½ new pence) spent on goods, so large numbers of stamps had to be stuck into the books. At a later stage, a second denomination of stamp was added, worth 10 of the original stamps, which somewhat alleviated this problem.

Finally, towards the end, there was a single large stamp worth 40 standard stamps. This was printed with a carmine background around the traditional green shield logo.

== Popular culture ==
Progressive rock band Genesis, in the song "Dancing with the Moonlit Knight" from their 1973 album Selling England by the Pound, invented the "Knights of the Green Shield" to allow the pun "Knights of the Green Shield stamp and shout". This was part of a comic theme related to supermarkets and encapsulated in the album's title.

British comedy rock group Bonzo Dog Doo-Dah Band references a woman who runs a fictional "Green Shield Library" in the song "Piggy Bank Love," written by Neil Innes on their 1967 debut album "Gorilla."

Jethro Tull, another progressive rock band, also mentioned Green Shield stamps in the song "Broadford Bazaar", which was about a town on the Scottish Isle of Skye which band leader Ian Anderson lived near: "We'll take pounds, francs, and dollars from the well-heeled, And stamps from the Green Shield".

Nikki Sudden wrote a song called "Green Shield Stamps" for his last official album The Truth Doesn't Matter. It describes his childhood in Britain, and how his mother used to save the Green Shield stamps. There is also an acoustic solo version from the Cake Shop, New York, on 24 March 2006, recorded two days before his unexpected death.

Michael Flanders makes reference to them in the opening patter to the Flanders and Swann song "Sounding Brass": "We now turn to number two on your song sheets. Don't strain your eyes trying to read them, though, because I shall be telling you exactly what comes next; in any case, these rather fanciful titles that we print on the programmes bear no relation to what we're going to sing. It's a dead waste of a shilling, is what I say. You don't even get green stamps. Well worth collecting, those stamps, my goodness; you know that really is a very nice suit."

In "Waldorf Salad," a 1979 episode of British sitcom Fawlty Towers, an American tourist sarcastically asks Basil Fawlty, "What do you get for living in a climate like this? Green Stamps?"

In "Oh What a Beautiful Mourning," a 1972 episode of Steptoe and Son, Harold reminds the vendor that he is due treble green stamps after taking his horse and cart through a car wash, then later hands the six stamps to his father saying jokingly "Another half million and you can get that motor bike you always wanted."

In "The Class of '62", a 1991 episode of Only Fools and Horses, it is mentioned that Roy Slater planted three thousand stolen Green Shield stamps on Trigger, which led to Trigger spending 18 months in a young offenders' centre.
