= Unfairness doctrine =

The unfairness doctrine is a doctrine in United States trade regulation law under which the Federal Trade Commission (FTC) can declare a business practice "unfair" because it is oppressive or harmful to consumers even though the practice is not an antitrust violation, an incipient antitrust violation, a violation of the "spirit" of the antitrust laws, or a deceptive practice.

The doctrine was first authoritatively recognized in FTC v. Sperry & Hutchinson Trading Stamp Co., although earlier Supreme Court decisions had suggested it in obiter dicta.

The FTC has, on occasion, invoked the doctrine against oppressive practices that were not antitrust violations and not recognizably deceptive practices, such as the use of the holder in due course rule by retailers catering to the very poor and the practice of mail-order sellers suing consumers in states remote from where they live. The FTC has recently invoked the doctrine against spyware.
