= FTC v. Sperry & Hutchinson Trading Stamp Co. =

Federal Trade Commission v. Sperry & Hutchinson Trading Stamp Co.
- Supreme Court of the United States

Argued November 15, 1971 Decided March 1, 1972
- Full case name: Federal Trade Commission v. Sperry & Hutchinson Trading Stamp Co.
- Citations: 405 U.S. 233 (more) 92 S. Ct. 898; 31 L. Ed. 2d 170; 1972 U.S. LEXIS 154; 1972 Trade Cas. (CCH) ¶ 73,861

Holding
- The Federal Trade Commission (FTC) may act against a company’s “unfair” business practices even though the practice is none of the following: an antitrust violation, an incipient antitrust violation, a violation of the “spirit” of the antitrust laws, or a deceptive practice. This legal theory is termed the "unfairness doctrine."

Court membership
- Chief Justice Warren E. Burger Associate Justices William O. Douglas · William J. Brennan Jr. Potter Stewart · Byron White; Thurgood Marshall · Harry Blackmun; Lewis F. Powell Jr. · William Rehnquist

Case opinion
- Majority: White, joined by Burger, Douglas, Brennan, Stewart, Marshall, Blackmun
- Powell and Rehnquist took no part in the consideration or decision of the case.

Redemption page of an S&H Green Stamps booklet. Note the language on the lower right admonishing the consumer not to buy or sell the stamps.

Federal Trade Commission v. Sperry & Hutchinson Trading Stamp Co., 405 U.S. 233 (1972), is a decision of the United States Supreme Court holding that the Federal Trade Commission (FTC) may act against a company's “unfair” business practices even though the practice is none of the following: an antitrust violation, an incipient antitrust violation, a violation of the “spirit” of the antitrust laws, or a deceptive practice. This legal theory is termed the "unfairness doctrine."

== Background ==
The Sperry & Hutchinson Trading Stamp Co. (S&H) was in the business of issuing and "redeeming" S&H trading stamps. As explained in the Court's opinion, trading stamps are a form of “scrip.” They can be used to purchase goods but only at a designated “store.” S&H sold the stamps to merchants, such as supermarket chains, which then “gave” the stamps to their customers, typically at the rate of one stamp for each ten cents worth of purchases. The customers were instructed to paste the S&H stamps into booklets, and when they had accumulated enough booklets full of S&H stamps they could “redeem” them at an S&H redemption center for “gifts”—merchandise, such as golf clubs or blenders. S&H accounted for 40% of the US trading stamp business and more than 60% of US consumers saved S&H stamps; the industry annually issued 400 billion stamps to more than 200,000 stores, and they were distributed to the public in connection with retail sales of $40 billion.

S&H placed restrictive notices in the booklets, advising consumers that they did not own the stamps, that their only right was to paste the stamps into the booklets and redeem booklets at an S&H redemption center, and that they could not buy, sell, or swap stamps. Other trading stamp companies (such as Gold Bond) operated on a similar basis. S&H enforced the restrictions by suing merchants who “trafficked” in S&H stamps, for example, by accepting them in partial payment for merchandise. S&H also sued “trading stamp exchanges,” which were businesses that permitted consumers, for a fee, to swap one kind of stamp for another, in order to consolidate the consumers’ stamp holdings into one brand and thus more rapidly redeem their stamp holdings. Some consumers, the Court noted, “may seek to sell [their] stamps in order to use the resulting cash to make more basic purchases (food, shoes, etc.) than redemption centers normally provide.” S&H attempted to suppress all such “trafficking.”

The FTC sued S&H for this practice (among others) on the ground that this was unfair and oppressive to consumers. After administrative hearings, the FTC ordered S&H to stop interfering with consumers and trading stamp “traffickers” by trying to “suppress the operation of trading stamp exchanges and other ‘free and open’ redemption of stamps.”

== Judgment ==
=== Court of Appeals ===
S&H appealed to the Fifth Circuit, which reversed the FTC’s order because section 5 of the FTC Act, under which the FTC had proceeded, “empowers the Commission to restrain only such practices as are either in violation of the antitrust laws, deceptive, or repugnant to public morals.” The Fifth Circuit added that the FTC could declare “unfair” and prohibit only antitrust violations or violations of the spirit of the antitrust laws.

=== Supreme Court ===
The Supreme Court reversed the decision of the Fifth Circuit. After reviewing the legislative history of the statute and the case law, the Court held that

Legislative and judicial authorities alike convince us that the Federal Trade Commission does not arrogate excessive power to itself if, in measuring a practice against the elusive but congressionally mandated standard of fairness, it, like a court of equity, considers public values beyond simply those enshrined in the letter or encompassed in the spirit of the antitrust laws.

== Significance ==
The FTC has occasionally invoked the unfairness doctrine against practices that did not readily fit into existing antitrust or deceptive practices categories, but until recently has not brought many such cases. Currently, however, the FTC has been using the unfairness doctrine against use of spyware.

== See also ==
- Unfairness doctrine
