= S&H Green Stamps =

Series of American trading stamps

S&H Green Stamps

Booklet covers

S&H Green Stamps was a line of trading stamps popular in the United States from 1896 until the late 1980s. They were distributed as part of a rewards program operated by the Sperry & Hutchinson company (S&H), founded in 1896 by Thomas Sperry and Shelley Byron Hutchinson. During the 1960s, the company issued more stamps than the U.S. Postal Service and distributed 35 million catalogs a year. Customers received stamps at the checkout counters of supermarkets, department stores, and gasoline stations among other retailers, which could then be redeemed for products from the catalog.

S&H Green Stamps had several competitors, including Greenbax Stamps offered by Piggly Wiggly, Gold Bell Gift Stamps (in the Midwest), Triple S Stamps (offered by Grand Union Supermarkets), Gold Bond Stamps, Blue Chip Stamps, Plaid Stamps (a project of A&P Supermarkets), Top Value Stamps, King Korn Stamps, Quality Stamps, Gunn Brothers given by Safeway, Buccaneer, and Eagle Stamps (a project of several divisions of the May Department Stores Co. of St. Louis, Missouri and offered, notably, by May Company stores, supermarkets, drug stores, gas stations, and dry cleaners in the Midwest area).

When Top Value Stamps ceased operations in the early 1980s, S&H accepted savings books of unredeemed Top Value stamps. S&H itself ceased business in 2020.

== History ==
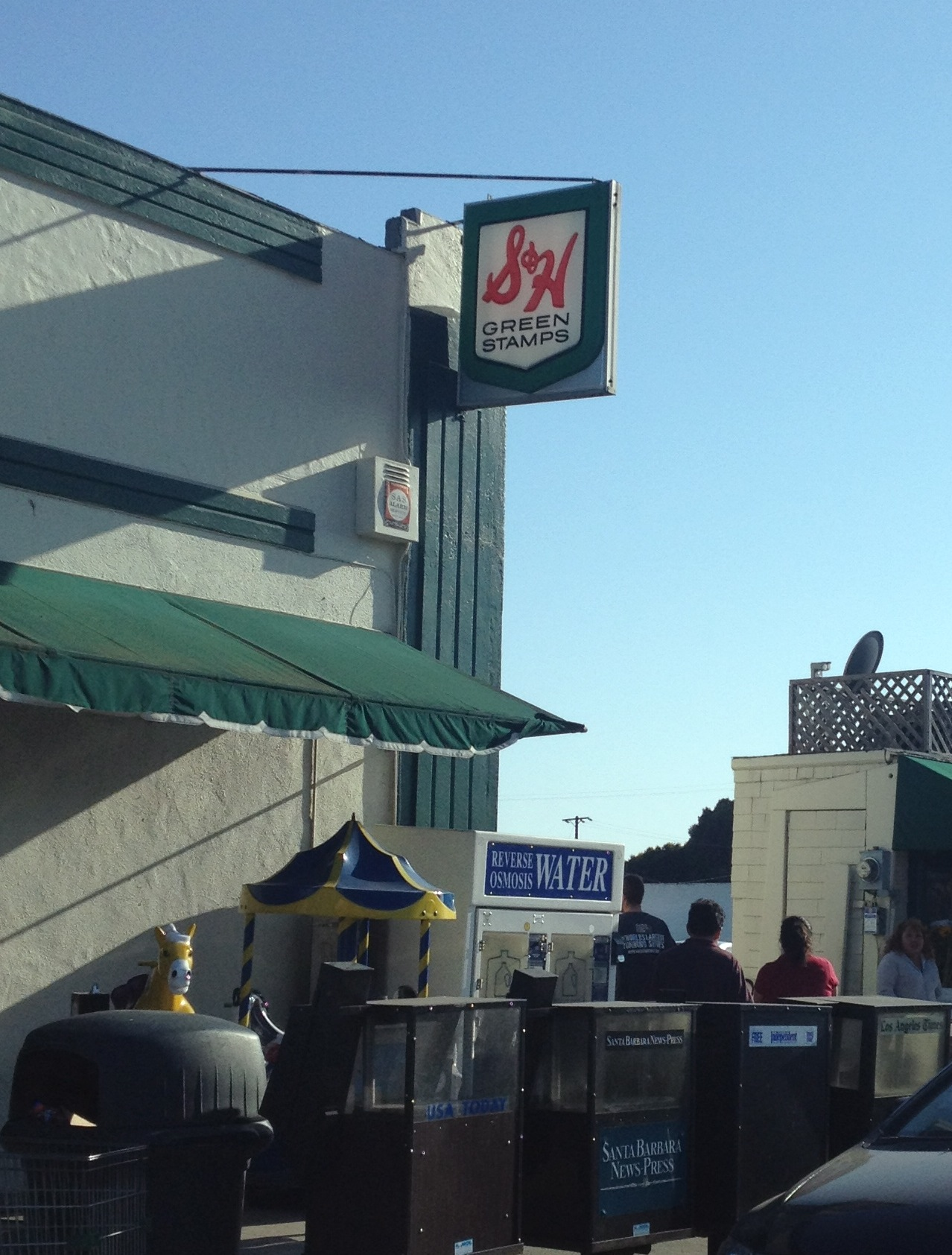
S&H Green Stamps sign preserved on a grocery store building in Goleta near Santa Barbara, California

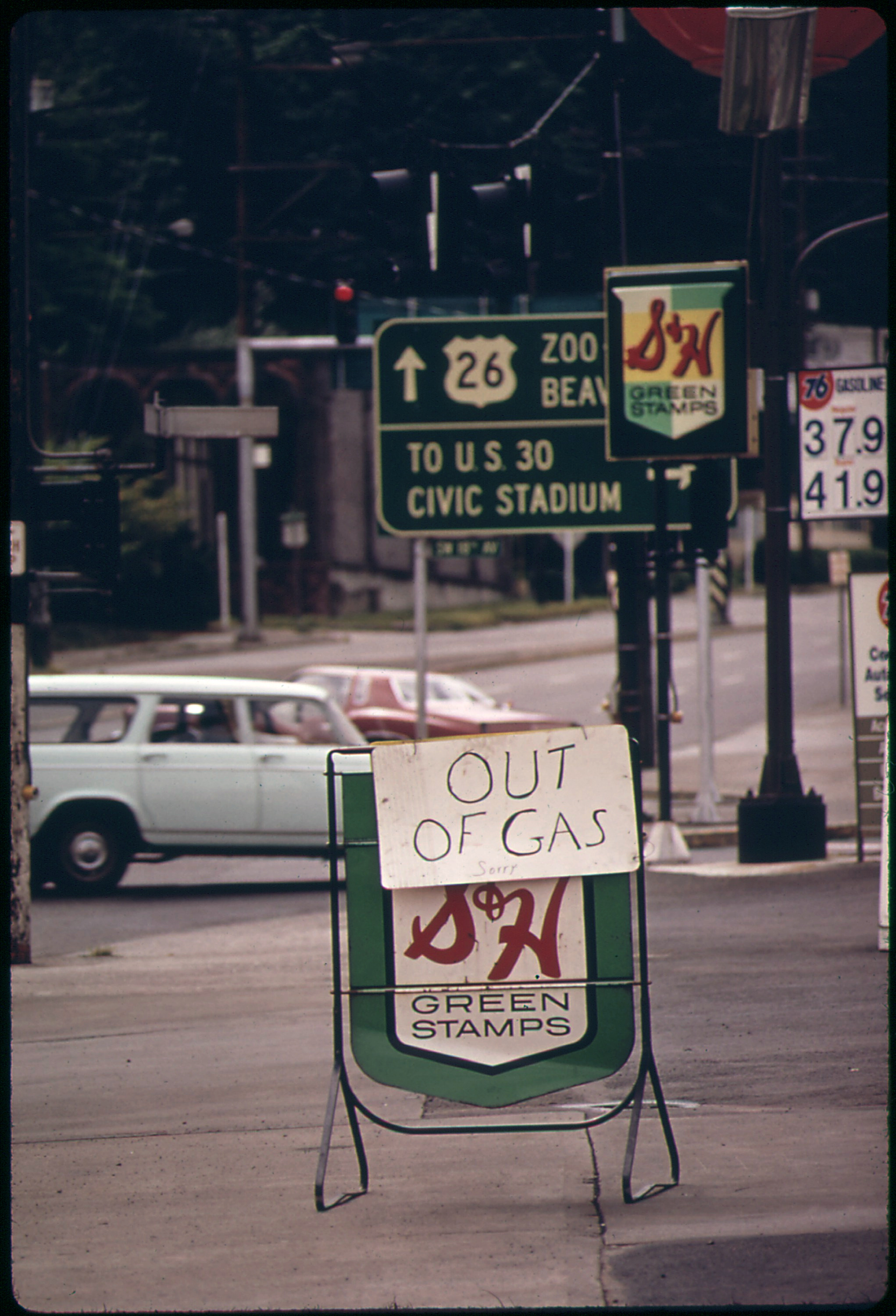
A repurposed S&H Green Stamps sign in 1973 (See 1973 oil crisis)

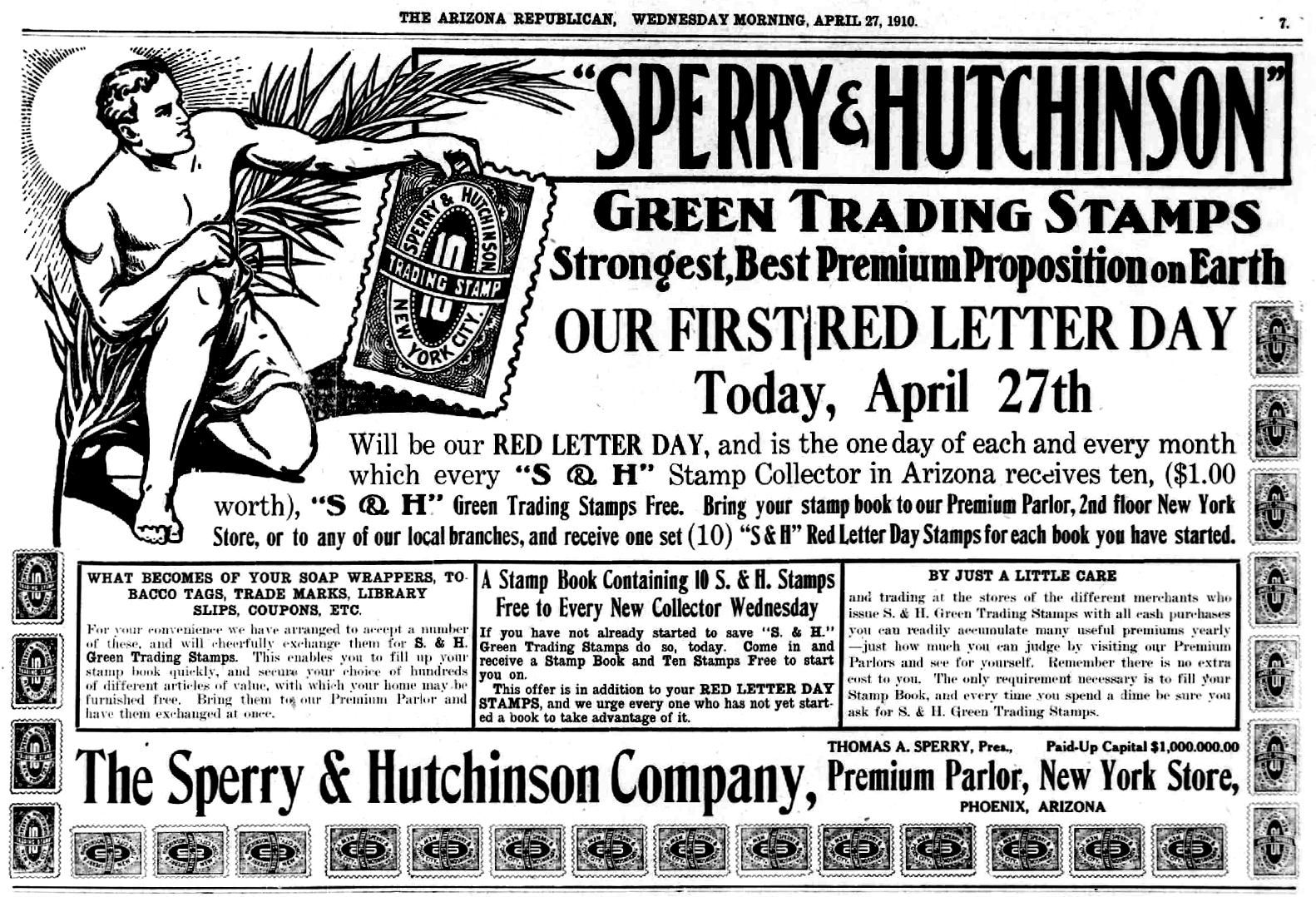
A 1910 newspaper ad for the program shows the stamps and gives a description of the programs and offers.

=== Beginnings ===
Sperry & Hutchinson began offering stamps to U.S. retailers in 1896. The retail organizations that distributed the stamps were primarily supermarkets, gasoline filling stations, and stores. They bought the stamps from S&H and gave them as bonuses to shoppers based on the dollar amount of a purchase. A 1963 magazine article stated that the average supermarket paid $2.45 ($25.36 in 2024 dollars) for the stamps needed to fill one collector book.

The stamps were issued in denominations of one, ten, and fifty points, perforated with a gummed reverse. As shoppers accumulated the stamps, they moistened the reverse and mounted them in collector's books, which were provided free by S&H. The books contained 24 pages and filling a page required 50 points, so each book contained 1,200 points. Shoppers could exchange filled books for premiums, including housewares and other items, from the local Green Stamps store or catalog. Each premium was assigned a value expressed by the number of filled stamp books required to obtain it.

=== Classification ===
Green Stamps were one of the early retail loyalty programs, by which retailers purchased the stamps from the operating company and then gave them away at a rate determined by the merchant. Some shoppers chose one merchant over another because they gave out more stamps per dollar spent.

=== International ===
The company also traded overseas. During the early 1960s, it initiated S&H Pink Stamps in the United Kingdom, having been beaten to their green shield trademark during 1958 by Richard Tompkins's Green Shield Trading Stamp Company.

=== Decline ===
==== Legal issues ====
In 1972, in FTC v. Sperry & Hutchinson Trading Stamp Co., the Supreme Court held that the Federal Trade Commission could prohibit "unfair" practices under Section 5 of the FTC Act even where they did not violate antitrust law, but sent the case back because the Commission had not adequately explained how its findings supported its conclusions. The case concerned S&H's efforts to stop unauthorized stamp exchanges and redemption centers. Sperry and Hutchinson was sold by the founders' successors in 1981 to Baldwin United. In 1999, it was purchased from Leucadia National, a holding firm, by a member of the founding Sperry family. At that time, only about 100 U.S. stores were offering Green Stamps.

==== Online factors ====
Eventually, with the rise of the Internet and the World Wide Web, the company modified its practices, and offered "greenpoints" as rewards for online purchases. The Greenpoints could be earned and redeemed at only a few stores, such as Foodtown in New York state and New Jersey.

The S&H Greenpoints program was discontinued as of October 4, 2020, and it was announced that all legacy S&H Green Stamps no longer had value and could no longer be redeemed, while S&H Greenpoints totals would be transferred to a new program called Freshpoints.

=== Purchase ===
Anthony Zolezzi, the founder of Bubba Gump Shrimp Company, Pet Promise Natural Dog Food, and Greenopolis Recycling Rewards, purchased the company in 2013 with plans to relaunch it.

== Furniture division ==
Between 1969 and 1971, Sperry & Hutchinson bought four furniture companies which became part of a Richmond, Virginia-based furniture division in 1974. While S&H bought other furniture companies, the first four became a furniture company in High Point next to Greensboro, North Carolina called S&H Furniture in 1976. In 1981, S&H executives bought the division along with other investors, forming LADD Holding Co. in 1981 and LADD Furniture Inc. in 1983.

== S & H Solutions ==
On December 7, 2006, it was announced that S&H Solutions was purchased by Pay By Touch based in San Francisco. The purchase price was in excess of $100 million in cash and stock. Pay By Touch suddenly shut its operations in 2008 and sold its assets to other corporations. S&H Solutions was acquired in 2012 by Prologics Redemption Solutions, a company which creates private-label retailer loyalty reward systems.

== In pop culture ==
S&H Green Stamps were immortalized in 1962 when Andy Warhol incorporated their imagery into his Pop art. In an exhibition at the Philadelphia Institute of Contemporary Art in 1965 he glued them all over a whole wall (later painted over). The original painting S&H Green Stamps last sold for $5.2 million at auction.

Mentioned in the 1961 song "Speedy Gonzales" by David Hess, that "Down at the cantina, they are giving green stamps with tequila".
