= William Miller Sperry Observatory =

Observatory in New Jersey, US

- Location: New Jersey, United States
- Coordinates: 40°39′59″N 74°19′24″W
- Altitude: 23 m (75 ft)
- Website: www.asterism.org/jsp/observatory.jsp

Telescopes
- E.T. Pearson Memorial Telescope: 24-inch reflector

The William Miller Sperry Observatory, also known simply as the Sperry Observatory, is an astronomical observatory owned by Union County College and operated by Amateur Astronomers, Incorporated. The observatory is located on the property of Union County College on their Cranford, New Jersey campus. It was named after William Miller Sperry and dedicated in 1967.

Mrs. Carrie Regina Beinecke and her son, William Sperry Beinecke, made a $150,000 donation to what was then the Union County Junior College. The donation was used to build Sperry Observatory, which was dedicated on May 21, 1967 in honor of William Miller Sperry, Mrs. Beinecke's father. Harvard astronomer Harlow Shapley was the keynote speaker at the 1967 dedication.

Sperry Observatory has been operated since its dedication by Amateur Astronomers, Inc. The observatory houses two of the largest telescopes on the East Coast open to the public on a weekly basis. The East Dome holds a 10-inch f/15 refractor built by AAI members and donated to the college in November 1972. The West Dome has a 24-inch f/11 Cassegrain reflector purchased and owned by AAI, and installed in October 1974.

== See also ==
- List of astronomical observatories
