= Thomas Sperry =

American businessman

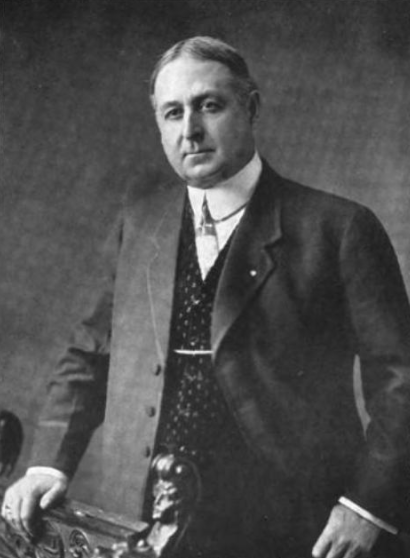
- Born: Thomas Alexander Sperry; July 6, 1864; Knoxville, Tennessee, U.S.
- Died: September 2, 1913 (aged 49); New York City, U.S.
- Occupation: Businessman
- Spouse: Kate Major (m. 1891)
- Children: 4

Thomas Alexander Sperry (July 6, 1864 – September 2, 1913) was the co-founder and the "S" of S&H Green Stamps, together with Shelley Byron Hutchinson of Ypsilanti, Michigan.

== Biography ==
Thomas Alexander Sperry was born in Knoxville, Tennessee, on July 6, 1864. He married Kate Major on January 1, 1891.

Sperry's son, also named Thomas, was born in Cranford, New Jersey, in 1898. Sperry also had one other son, Stuart Major, and two daughters, Marjorie and Katherine.

Sperry Sr.'s home in Cranford was destroyed by a fire in 1912, with the fire causing an estimated $150,000 in damages, including the loss of a number of paintings — many from the Charles W. Morse gallery. Sperry's horse trainer and chauffeur were able to rescue several paintings from the house's music room before they were stopped by flames, including an oil painting of Sperry's son on the horse on which he had won a ribbon the previous day at the Plainfield Horse Show. After a firefighter threw down a painting of Sperry's wife in her wedding gown, Mrs. Sperry was quoted as calling out "Don't save that! Save something worth while."

Sperry died in New York City at the age of 49 on September 2, 1913, of ptomaine poisoning contracted during the return voyage after a two-month trip to Europe. Sperry was brought ashore in a stretcher and his condition was too bad to travel to his home in Cranford.

Katherine Sperry married Walter Beinecke in 1917. His niece, Carrie Sperry, had married Walter's brother, Frederick Beinecke, in 1912. Their son is William Sperry Beinecke. The family donated land in Cranford to the Rahway River Parkway along the Rahway River. Thomas Sperry was involved with real estate businesses and died in Palm Beach, Florida, in 1973. Marjorie Sperry settled in Middletown Township, New Jersey, purchasing the former estate and gardens of mobster Vito Genovese and rehabilitated it, later donating it to the Monmouth County Park System to create Deep Cut Gardens.

== Business ==
Together with Hutchinson, Sperry founded the Sperry and Hutchinson Company in 1896. Sperry and Hutchinson started their business in Michigan and became what The New York Times described as "the first independent trading stamp company to distribute stamps and books to merchants". The stamps gained popularity during the early 1900s as the S&H program offered incentives to shoppers, rewarding them for making timely payments in cash, helping to maintain customer loyalty to participating merchants.

S&H Green Stamps had peak popularity during the 1960s; a significant percentage of supermarkets and gasoline stations gave the stamps to customers with their purchases. The firm had 800 redemption centers nationwide where stamps were traded for products. For a period in the 1960s, the firm was printing more stamps annually than the United States Postal Service.

== Conflict ==
In 1921, Hutchinson sued the estate of Thomas A. Sperry in court in Trenton, New Jersey, alleging that Sperry had defrauded Hutchinson of part of his shares in the company, allowing William Miller Sperry, brother of the founder, to gain control of the firm. Hutchinson alleged that he had been cheated out of $5 million as a result of secret dividends that diverted company funds to Sperry.
