= Kanipe =

Kanipe may refer to:

- 84447 Jeffkanipe, a main-belt asteroid named after Jeff Kanipe
- Jeff Kanipe (born 1953), an American science writer
