= Meanings of minor-planet names: 84001–85000 =

As minor planet discoveries are confirmed, they are given a permanent number by the IAU's Minor Planet Center (MPC), and the discoverers can then submit names for them, following the IAU's naming conventions. The list below concerns those minor planets in the specified number-range that have received names, and explains the meanings of those names.

Official naming citations of newly named small Solar System bodies are approved and published in a bulletin by IAU's Working Group for Small Bodies Nomenclature (WGSBN). Before May 2021, citations were published in MPC's Minor Planet Circulars for many decades. Recent citations can also be found on the JPL Small-Body Database (SBDB). Until his death in 2016, German astronomer Lutz D. Schmadel compiled these citations into the Dictionary of Minor Planet Names (DMP) and regularly updated the collection.

Based on Paul Herget's The Names of the Minor Planets, Schmadel also researched the unclear origin of numerous asteroids, most of which had been named prior to World War II. This article incorporates text from this source, which is in the public domain: SBDB New namings may only be added to this list below after official publication as the preannouncement of names is condemned. The WGSBN publishes a comprehensive guideline for the naming rules of non-cometary small Solar System bodies.

== 84001–84100 ==
Named minor planet	Provisional	This minor planet was named for...	Ref · Catalog
84011 Jean-Claude	2002 OB_{25}	Jean-Claude Pelle (born 1942), a French amateur astronomer and discoverer of minor planets	JPL · 84011
84012 Deluise	2002 PR	Fiore De Luise (born 1977), an Italian astronomer and discoverer of minor planets at the University of Rome who has collaborated with the CINEOS program	JPL · 84012
84015 Efthymiopoulos	2002 PV_{34}	Christos Efthymiopoulos (born 1971) is Research Director at the Research Center for Astronomy of the Academy of Athens, and teaches Dynamical Astronomy at the Physics Department of the University of Athens.	JPL · 84015
84075 Peterpatricia	2002 PL_{165}	Peter M. Lowe (born 1933) and Patricia Lowe (born 1935), parents of the Canadian amateur astronomer Andrew Lowe who discovered this minor planet	JPL · 84075
84095 Davidjohn	2002 QV_{48}	David John Matson (born 1937), father of American astronomer Robert Matson who discovered this minor planet	JPL · 84095
84096 Reginaldglenice	2002 QD_{58}	Reginald J. Harding (born 1932) and Glenice E. Harding (born 1931), parents-in-law of the discoverer Andrew Lowe	JPL · 84096
84100 Farnocchia	2002 RP_{8}	Davide Farnocchia (born 1984), a mathematician and celestial mechanic at the University of Pisa	JPL · 84100

== 84101–84200 ==
back to top

Named minor planet	Provisional	This minor planet was named for...	Ref · Catalog
84118 Bracalicioci	2002 RE_{26}	Davide Bracali Cioci (born 1986), a celestial mechanician who graduated from the University of Pisa.	JPL · 84118
84119 Sanitariitaliani	2002 RF_{26}	All doctors, nurses and everyone else in the Italian healthcare system (Sanitari Italiani) who played an essential role in the COVID-19 pandemic in Italy	IAU · 84119
84120 Antonacci	2002 RY_{27}	Domenico Antonacci (born 1969), who has been involved in astronomy outreach for several years. He has been a pioneer for disabled people, in particular the blind. He founded the Associazione Cascinese Astrofili, and has been one of the founders and communicators at the astronomical observatory of Libbiano (PI), Italy.	JPL · 84120
84200 Robertmoore	2002 RM_{122}	Robert Moore (born 1923), American space engineer who worked on the Mercury program, Titan missiles, Fleetsatcom and the Tracking and Data Relay Satellite System	JPL · 84200

== 84201–84300 ==
back to top

Named minor planet	Provisional	This minor planet was named for...	Ref · Catalog
84224 Kyte	2002 RB_{233}	Frank Kyte (born 1949), American geochemist and meteoriticist who studies the component of distal impact deposits of meteorites	JPL · 84224
84225 Verish	2002 RO_{236}	Robert S. Verish (born 1947), an American meteor observer and meteorite hunter. He has found over 100 meteorites in California, Nevada and Arizona, including the "Los Angeles" Shergottite – the fourteenth recognized meteorite from Mars (also see Novato meteorite).	MPC · 84225

== 84301–84400 ==
back to top

Named minor planet	Provisional	This minor planet was named for...	Ref · Catalog
84339 Francescaballi	2002 TR_{57}	Francesca Balli (born 1969) fiancée of the discoverer Fabrizio Bernardi. She has been a lawyer since 1999 and is presently a civil and commercial mediator.	JPL · 84339
84340 Jos	2002 TO_{58}	Jos Dianovich Claerbout (1974–1999), beloved son of Jon and Diane Claerbout, was an American writer, web engineer, film producer, and creator of magnificent hats. Src	JPL · 84340
84342 Rubensdeazevedo	2002 TP_{64}	Rubens de Azevedo (1921–2008) was a Brazilian astronomer and science promoter. He founded observatories and associations, including the Brazilian Society of Astronomy Friends, the first amateur astronomical association in Brazil. He was a selenographer and active participant in NASA's Lunar International Observers Network.	IAU · 84342

== 84401–84500 ==
back to top

Named minor planet	Provisional	This minor planet was named for...	Ref · Catalog
84417 Ritabo	2002 TE_{202}	Rita Boles, wife of Scottish amateur astronomer and discoverer of this minor planet, Tom Boles	JPL · 84417
84447 Jeffkanipe	2002 TU_{240}	Jeff Kanipe (born 1953), an American astronomical author and editor, who became interested in a spike extending out of the image of Arp 192 = NGC 3303 while working on a publication for the fortieth anniversary of Arp's Atlas of Peculiar Galaxies. This led to its recognition in 2009 as a prediscovery trail of this minor planet on 19 February 1964.	JPL · 84447

== 84501–84600 ==
back to top

Named minor planet	Provisional	This minor planet was named for...	Ref · Catalog
84566 VIMS	2002 VS_{9}	The Visible and Infrared Mapping Spectrometer (VIMS) on board the Cassini–Huygens spacecraft studied the Saturnian system for 13 years (2004–2017). It provided data to determine the composition, temperatures and structures of surfaces, rings and atmospheres.	JPL · 84566

== 84601–84700 ==
back to top

Named minor planet	Provisional	This minor planet was named for...	Ref · Catalog
There are no named minor planets in this number range

== 84701–84800 ==
back to top

Named minor planet	Provisional	This minor planet was named for...	Ref · Catalog
There are no named minor planets in this number range

== 84801–84900 ==
back to top

Named minor planet	Provisional	This minor planet was named for...	Ref · Catalog
84882 Table Mountain	2003 CN_{16}	The site of the Table Mountain Observatory in California was developed by the Smithsonian Institution in 1924 to conduct studies of the solar constant. In 1958 the Jet Propulsion Laboratory began solar panel tests at this site, now a NASA facility where atmospheric study groups and optical astronomy conduct daily science year round.	JPL · 84882
84884 Dorismcmillan	2003 FS_{20}	Doris McMillan (1909–1999) of San Benito, Texas, was a science educator with Cranbrook Institute of Science in Bloomfield Hills, Michigan, in the 1960s and influential to many amateur and professional astronomers, space scientists and educators.	JPL · 84884

== 84901–85000 ==
back to top

Named minor planet	Provisional	This minor planet was named for...	Ref · Catalog
84902 Porrentruy	2003 UU_{11}	The village of Porrentruy in Switzerland	JPL · 84902
84919 Karinthy	2003 VH	Frigyes Karinthy (1887–1938) was a Hungarian author, playwright, poet, journalist and translator. His sense of humor and criticism already appeared in his early diaries. He started his writing career as a journalist and remained a writer of short, humorous blurbs until his death. He is one of the most popular Hungarian writers	JPL · 84919
84921 Morkoláb	2003 VN_{1}	The Morkoláb (or Markolaáb), Hungarian mythical animal that eats the Sun or Moon during an eclipse; this object was discovered during a total lunar eclipse	JPL · 84921
84926 Marywalker	2003 WR_{3}	Mary Walker (born 1960), the Instrument Systems Manager for the OSIRIS-REx Mission.	JPL · 84926
84928 Oliversacks	2003 WE_{13}	Oliver Sacks (1933–2015), a British neurologist and author. His descriptions of people confronting neurological challenges such as Parkinson's disease and Alzheimer's, together with his books about the brain, botany, chemistry and music, have inspired generations of doctors, patients and readers around the world.	JPL · 84928
84943 Timothylinn	2003 WC_{148}	Timothy Linn (born 1970), the Systems Engineering Manager for the OSIRIS-REx Asteroid Sample Return Mission.	JPL · 84943
84945 Solosky	2003 WP_{153}	Phil Solosky (born 1945) and Sueko Solosky (born 1950) Solosky were active members of the Sunset Astronomical Society in Michigan in the 1970s.	JPL · 84945
84951 Kenwilson	2003 XX_{4}	Kenneth Dale Wilson (born 1954) is the former planetarium director with the Virginia Museum of Natural Sciences and a co-author of several books on amateur astronomy	JPL · 84951
84991 Bettyphilpotts	2003 YM_{94}	Betty Philpotts Wilson (born 1958) is a board member of the Richmond Astronomical Society and was their first female President.	JPL · 84991
84994 Amysimon	2003 YW_{106}	Amy Simon (born 1971), the Deputy Instrument Scientist for the OVIRS instrument on OSIRIS-REx	JPL · 84994
84995 Zselic	2003 YB_{108}	Zselic, one of Hungary's most beautiful wooded regions. A Starry Sky Park is being set up in the area.	JPL · 84995
84996 Hortobágy	2003 YW_{110}	Hortobágy National Park, an 800-square-km national park in eastern Hungary.	JPL · 84996

back to top

Preceded by 83,001–84,000	Meanings of minor-planet names List of minor planets: 84,001–85,000	Succeeded by 85,001–86,000
