= Amy Simon =

American planetary scientist

Amy A. Simon
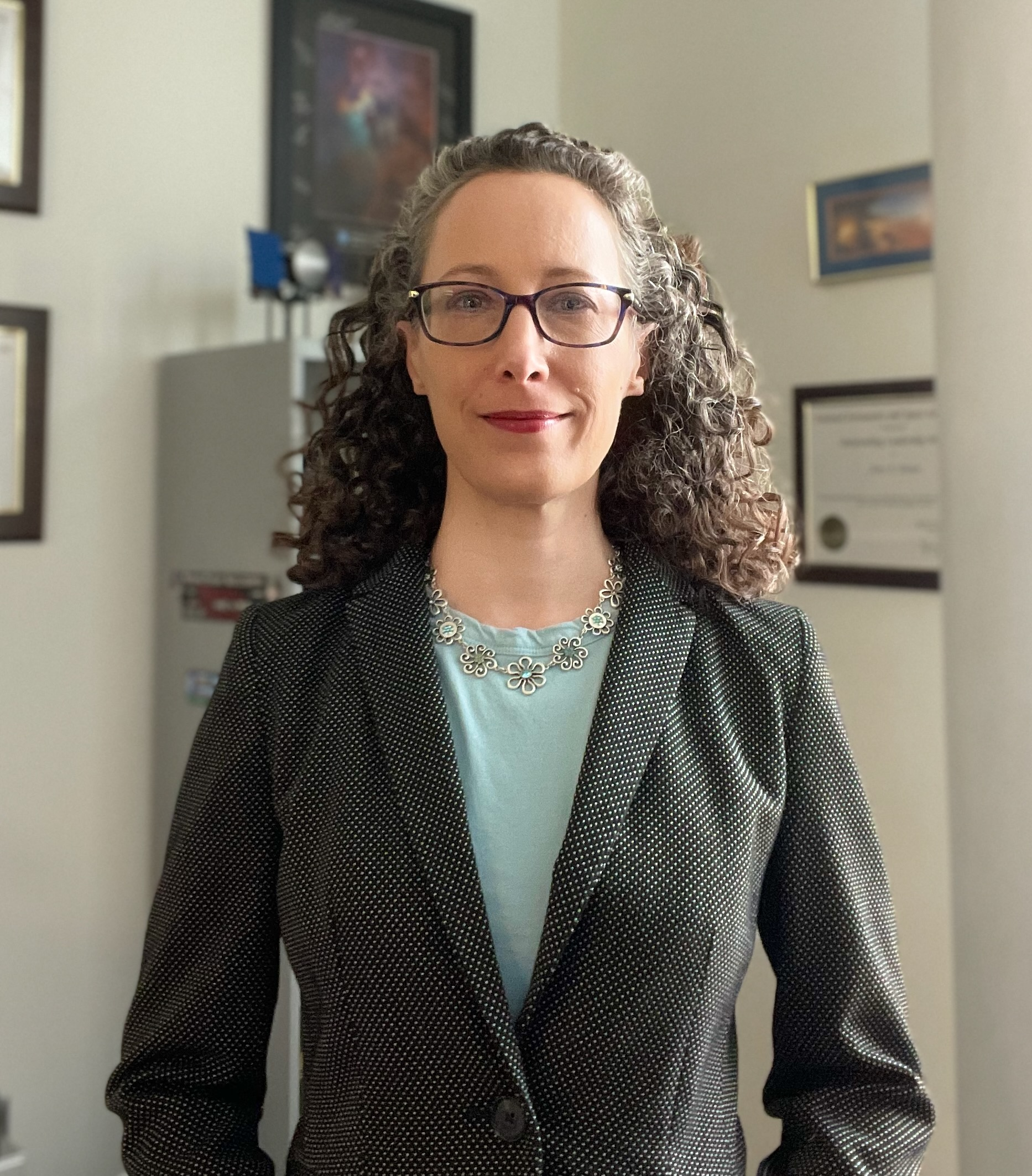
- Amy Simon in 2023
- Born: October 1971 (age 55); Union, New Jersey, U.S.
- Education: Florida Institute of Technology; New Mexico State University
- Children: 1 son
- Scientific career
- Fields: Planetary atmospheres Robotic exploration
- Workplaces: Cornell University; Goddard Space Flight Center

Amy Simon is an American planetary scientist at NASA's Goddard Space Flight Center, involved in several missions of the Solar System Exploration Program.

== Education ==
Simon is from Union Township, Union County, New Jersey, where she attended Union High School. She earned a bachelor's degree in Space Sciences from the Florida Institute of Technology in 1993 and was inducted into Sigma Pi Sigma. She completed her doctoral studies in astronomy at the New Mexico State University in 1998. Upon graduation, she became a postdoctoral research scientist at Cornell University.

== Career ==
Simon is a Senior Scientist in the Solar System Exploration Division at NASA's Goddard Space Flight Center, having joined NASA as a civil servant in 2001. She served as the Chief of the Planetary Systems Laboratory from 2008 to 2010 and the Associate Division Director from 2010 to 2013.

Her scientific research involves the study of the composition, dynamics, and cloud structure in jovian planet atmospheres, primarily from spacecraft observations, and as of 2023, she has authored more than 160 peer-reviewed publications.

Simon's experiences has consisted her of being a part of robotic flight missions and future mission concept development.

== Works ==
Her contributions include the first detailed study of the changing shape of Jupiter's Great Red Spot, as well as the discoveries of several types of waves in the atmosphere of Jupiter. Her analysis of Voyager 2, Cassini-Huygens, Hubble Space Telescope and New Horizons images led to the discovery of several new classes of Jupiter atmospheric waves.

Beyond Jupiter, she has studied atmospheric chemistry and dynamics on Saturn, including the north-polar hexagon. She was also part of a team that observed Neptune using the Kepler space telescope, detecting solar oscillations in light reflected off a planet for the first time.

Simon is involved in multiple robotic NASA planetary missions. She was a co-investigator on the Cassini-Huygens Composite Infrared Spectrometer (CIRS) and formerly was the deputy instrument scientist for the OSIRIS-REx Visible and IR Spectrometer (OVIRS), as well as for the Landsat 9 Thermal Infrared Sensor-2 instrument and the deputy principal investigator for the Lucy spacecraft L'Ralph instrument.

Since 2014, she has been the principal investigator of the Hubble Outer Planet Atmospheres Legacy (OPAL) program. Her team discovered a new Great Dark Spot on Neptune with Hubble and has published more than 12 manuscripts from OPAL data. Her work with OSIRIS-REX led to the discovery of hydrated minerals on the surface of Bennu and earned a NASA Exceptional Scientific Achievement Medal.

== Explorations ==
Simon also plans future planetary exploration missions. She served on the National Academy of Sciences' Space Studies Board 2013 Planetary Science Decadal Survey. She has co-led several mission studies for NASA including Flagship class missions to Enceladus and to the Ice Giants, Uranus, and Neptune. She was the principal investigator for the proposed New Frontiers class Saturn probe mission, SPRITE.

Simon is a member of the American Geophysical Union, the American Astronomical Society, and the Division for Planetary Sciences. She has organized the 2013 AGU Chapman conference and the 2024 Uranus Flagship workshop, both significant workshops in her field.

== Honors and awards ==
- American Geophysical Union, Union Fellow - 2025
- American Astronomical Society, Division for Planetary Sciences Claudia J. Alexander Prize - 2023
- Meritorious Senior Professional Presidential Rank Awards - 2022
- NASA Outstanding Leadership Medal – 2020
- John C. Lindsay Memorial Award for Space Science - 2020
- NASA Exceptional Scientific Achievement Medal – 2019
- NASA Silver Achievement Medal (OVIRS Team) – 2017
- NASA Group Achievement Award (OSIRIS-REx Team) – 2017
- Robert H. Goddard Science Achievement Award (Hubble OPAL Team) – 2016
- Robert H. Goddard Engineering Achievement Award (OVIRS Team)
- NASA Exceptional Service Medal – 2016
- Robert H. Goddard Exceptional Engineering (OVIRS Team) – 2014
- NASA Exceptional Service Medal – 2014
- Asteroid 84994 Amysimon, discovered by the Catalina Sky Survey in 2003, was named in her honor. The official naming citation was published by the Minor Planet Center on 14 May 2014 (M.P.C. 88406).
- NASA Group Achievement Award (Cassini CIRS Science Team)
