= Jeff Kanipe =

American science writer

- Monuments: 84447 Jeffkanipe
- Education: University of Texas at Austin
- Occupation: Science writer
- Spouse: Alexandra Witze
- Family: David Kanipe (brother)

Jeff Kanipe is an American science writer and author of astronomy books.

== Biography ==
Jeff received a degree in journalism from the University of Texas at Austin. He has been a science writer and editor for over 25 years, working as an editor for several space magazines including StarDate and Astronomy. For a period in the early 2000s he served as skywatching columnist at SPACE.com and host of the popular Ask the Astronomer forum. Occasionally he writes articles for such sites as well as scholarly magazines like Nature, but his real passion is writing astronomy books. He is author of the amateur astronomy series Annals of the Deep Sky: A Survey of Galactic and Extragalactic Objects, published by AAS Sky Publishing. He is a member of the American Astronomical Society and the Authors Guild.

Asteroid 84447 Jeffkanipe is named in his honor, for his discovery of the earliest known prediscovery image of the asteroid, previously known as 2002 TU240.

== Family ==
Jeff is married to Alexandra Witze, a correspondent for Nature magazine. They live in Boulder, Colorado, where Jeff is sometimes interviewed on astronomy topics for the Boulder Daily Camera. Jeff has two daughters: Hayley Bond, an archaeologist, and Carly Kanipe, a veterinary pathologist. His brother, David Kanipe, is a former NASA engineer and retired from teaching aerospace engineering at Texas A&M University in College Station.

== Books ==
- Annals of the Deep Sky: A Survey of Galactic and Extragalactic Objects (Ongoing series that began in 2015, first with Willmann-Bell, now with AAS Sky Publishing)
- Island on Fire: The Extraordinary Story of A Forgotten Volcano That Changed the World (2015, Pegasus Books, with Alexandra Witze)
- The Cosmic Connection: How Astronomical Events Impact Life on Earth (2009, Prometheus Books)
- The Arp Atlas of Peculiar Galaxies: A Chronicle and Observer's Guide (2007, Willmann-Bell)
- Chasing Hubble's Shadows: The Search for Galaxies at the Edge of Time (2006, Farrar Straus Giroux)
- Astronomy: The Definitive Guide (2003, Barnes & Noble Books)
- Star and Sky (2000, Discovery Insight Guides)
- A Skywatcher's Year (1999, Cambridge University Press)
- Advanced Skywatching (1997, Weldon Owen)
