= List of minor planets: 84001–85000 =

The following is a partial list of minor planets, running from minor-planet number 84001 through 85000, inclusive. The primary data for this and other partial lists is based on JPL's "Small-Body Orbital Elements" and data available from the Minor Planet Center. Critical list information is also provided by the MPC, unless otherwise specified from Lowell Observatory. A detailed description of the table's columns and additional sources are given on the main page including a complete list of every page in this series, and a statistical break-up on the dynamical classification of minor planets.

Also see the summary list of all named bodies in numerical and alphabetical order, and the corresponding naming citations for the number range of this particular list. New namings may only be added to this list after official publication, as the preannouncement of names is condemned by the Working Group for Small Bodies Nomenclature of the International Astronomical Union.

Near-Earth obj.	MBA (inner)	MBA (outer)	Centaur
Mars-crosser	MBA (middle)	Jupiter trojan	Trans-Neptunian obj.
Unclassified

== 84001–84100 ==
Designation			Discovery			Properties		Ref
Permanent	Provisional	Named after	Date	Site	Discoverer(s)	Category	Diam.	Ref
84001	2002 NE_{29}	—	July 13, 2002	Haleakala	NEAT	MAS	1.6 km	MPC · JPL
84002	2002 NB_{38}	—	July 9, 2002	Socorro	LINEAR	EUN	2.4 km	MPC · JPL
84003	2002 NA_{52}	—	July 14, 2002	Socorro	LINEAR	·	3.1 km	MPC · JPL
84004	2002 OT_{3}	—	July 17, 2002	Socorro	LINEAR	·	7.3 km	MPC · JPL
84005	2002 OC_{4}	—	July 17, 2002	Socorro	LINEAR	MAR	3.1 km	MPC · JPL
84006	2002 OJ_{4}	—	July 17, 2002	Socorro	LINEAR	·	4.0 km	MPC · JPL
84007	2002 OK_{12}	—	July 23, 2002	Palomar	NEAT	NYS	2.0 km	MPC · JPL
84008	2002 OP_{14}	—	July 18, 2002	Socorro	LINEAR	LIX	7.6 km	MPC · JPL
84009	2002 OM_{22}	—	July 31, 2002	Reedy Creek	J. Broughton	NYS	2.0 km	MPC · JPL
84010	2002 OZ_{23}	—	July 28, 2002	Haleakala	NEAT	·	7.5 km	MPC · JPL
84011 Jean-Claude	2002 OB_{25}	Jean-Claude	July 23, 2002	Palomar	S. F. Hönig	3:2	8.4 km	MPC · JPL
84012 Deluise	2002 PR	Deluise	August 2, 2002	Campo Imperatore	CINEOS	·	1.3 km	MPC · JPL
84013	2002 PZ_{5}	—	August 4, 2002	Palomar	NEAT	EOS	3.8 km	MPC · JPL
84014	2002 PG_{30}	—	August 6, 2002	Palomar	NEAT	·	3.5 km	MPC · JPL
84015 Efthymiopoulos	2002 PV_{34}	Efthymiopoulos	August 5, 2002	Campo Imperatore	CINEOS	·	2.5 km	MPC · JPL
84016	2002 PE_{37}	—	August 4, 2002	Socorro	LINEAR	·	3.8 km	MPC · JPL
84017	2002 PF_{37}	—	August 4, 2002	Socorro	LINEAR	EUN	2.4 km	MPC · JPL
84018	2002 PL_{37}	—	August 5, 2002	Socorro	LINEAR	·	1.8 km	MPC · JPL
84019	2002 PN_{37}	—	August 5, 2002	Socorro	LINEAR	NYS	2.7 km	MPC · JPL
84020	2002 PZ_{40}	—	August 4, 2002	Socorro	LINEAR	·	4.0 km	MPC · JPL
84021	2002 PC_{41}	—	August 4, 2002	Socorro	LINEAR	·	4.5 km	MPC · JPL
84022	2002 PR_{41}	—	August 5, 2002	Socorro	LINEAR	·	1.7 km	MPC · JPL
84023	2002 PX_{41}	—	August 5, 2002	Socorro	LINEAR	NYS	2.5 km	MPC · JPL
84024	2002 PB_{42}	—	August 5, 2002	Socorro	LINEAR	·	1.6 km	MPC · JPL
84025	2002 PN_{42}	—	August 5, 2002	Socorro	LINEAR	·	4.6 km	MPC · JPL
84026	2002 PO_{42}	—	August 5, 2002	Socorro	LINEAR	V	1.6 km	MPC · JPL
84027	2002 PE_{44}	—	August 5, 2002	Socorro	LINEAR	V	1.6 km	MPC · JPL
84028	2002 PN_{44}	—	August 5, 2002	Socorro	LINEAR	·	5.7 km	MPC · JPL
84029	2002 PT_{44}	—	August 5, 2002	Socorro	LINEAR	·	5.0 km	MPC · JPL
84030	2002 PY_{44}	—	August 5, 2002	Socorro	LINEAR	GEF	3.7 km	MPC · JPL
84031	2002 PZ_{45}	—	August 9, 2002	Socorro	LINEAR	·	5.3 km	MPC · JPL
84032	2002 PQ_{46}	—	August 9, 2002	Socorro	LINEAR	·	2.7 km	MPC · JPL
84033	2002 PT_{46}	—	August 9, 2002	Socorro	LINEAR	·	2.6 km	MPC · JPL
84034	2002 PL_{49}	—	August 10, 2002	Socorro	LINEAR	DOR	5.0 km	MPC · JPL
84035	2002 PX_{49}	—	August 10, 2002	Socorro	LINEAR	·	4.5 km	MPC · JPL
84036	2002 PF_{50}	—	August 10, 2002	Socorro	LINEAR	·	2.1 km	MPC · JPL
84037	2002 PH_{50}	—	August 10, 2002	Socorro	LINEAR	NYS	2.3 km	MPC · JPL
84038	2002 PQ_{50}	—	August 10, 2002	Socorro	LINEAR	·	1.4 km	MPC · JPL
84039	2002 PW_{50}	—	August 10, 2002	Socorro	LINEAR	·	3.8 km	MPC · JPL
84040	2002 PK_{54}	—	August 5, 2002	Socorro	LINEAR	·	1.4 km	MPC · JPL
84041	2002 PL_{55}	—	August 9, 2002	Socorro	LINEAR	·	2.7 km	MPC · JPL
84042	2002 PQ_{56}	—	August 9, 2002	Socorro	LINEAR	V	1.3 km	MPC · JPL
84043	2002 PA_{57}	—	August 9, 2002	Socorro	LINEAR	EUN	2.3 km	MPC · JPL
84044	2002 PB_{58}	—	August 9, 2002	Socorro	LINEAR	·	4.6 km	MPC · JPL
84045	2002 PN_{58}	—	August 10, 2002	Socorro	LINEAR	MAS · slow?	1.8 km	MPC · JPL
84046	2002 PF_{59}	—	August 10, 2002	Socorro	LINEAR	·	3.1 km	MPC · JPL
84047	2002 PZ_{59}	—	August 10, 2002	Socorro	LINEAR	·	3.1 km	MPC · JPL
84048	2002 PS_{60}	—	August 10, 2002	Socorro	LINEAR	·	1.8 km	MPC · JPL
84049	2002 PU_{60}	—	August 10, 2002	Socorro	LINEAR	·	3.3 km	MPC · JPL
84050	2002 PY_{60}	—	August 10, 2002	Socorro	LINEAR	·	2.9 km	MPC · JPL
84051	2002 PL_{63}	—	August 11, 2002	Palomar	NEAT	NYS	2.0 km	MPC · JPL
84052	2002 PB_{69}	—	August 10, 2002	Socorro	LINEAR	·	7.7 km	MPC · JPL
84053	2002 PS_{71}	—	August 12, 2002	Socorro	LINEAR	·	6.1 km	MPC · JPL
84054	2002 PE_{84}	—	August 10, 2002	Socorro	LINEAR	MAS	1.8 km	MPC · JPL
84055	2002 PM_{84}	—	August 10, 2002	Socorro	LINEAR	PHO	5.7 km	MPC · JPL
84056	2002 PK_{86}	—	August 13, 2002	Socorro	LINEAR	·	2.5 km	MPC · JPL
84057	2002 PL_{93}	—	August 14, 2002	Palomar	NEAT	H	1.2 km	MPC · JPL
84058	2002 PQ_{101}	—	August 12, 2002	Socorro	LINEAR	·	2.9 km	MPC · JPL
84059	2002 PV_{104}	—	August 12, 2002	Socorro	LINEAR	·	7.9 km	MPC · JPL
84060	2002 PV_{112}	—	August 12, 2002	Socorro	LINEAR	·	2.0 km	MPC · JPL
84061	2002 PJ_{113}	—	August 14, 2002	Socorro	LINEAR	·	2.8 km	MPC · JPL
84062	2002 PQ_{117}	—	August 15, 2002	Socorro	LINEAR	·	3.2 km	MPC · JPL
84063	2002 PC_{122}	—	August 13, 2002	Anderson Mesa	LONEOS	DOR	4.8 km	MPC · JPL
84064	2002 PK_{126}	—	August 14, 2002	Socorro	LINEAR	·	2.5 km	MPC · JPL
84065	2002 PQ_{128}	—	August 14, 2002	Socorro	LINEAR	·	5.0 km	MPC · JPL
84066	2002 PM_{133}	—	August 14, 2002	Socorro	LINEAR	·	2.3 km	MPC · JPL
84067	2002 PN_{135}	—	August 14, 2002	Socorro	LINEAR	·	2.8 km	MPC · JPL
84068	2002 PK_{138}	—	August 1, 2002	Socorro	LINEAR	H	1.8 km	MPC · JPL
84069	2002 PL_{138}	—	August 1, 2002	Socorro	LINEAR	H	1.2 km	MPC · JPL
84070	2002 PE_{139}	—	August 12, 2002	Socorro	LINEAR	HNS	2.2 km	MPC · JPL
84071	2002 PC_{142}	—	August 8, 2002	Palomar	NEAT	·	1.4 km	MPC · JPL
84072	2002 PP_{142}	—	August 1, 2002	Socorro	LINEAR	·	3.4 km	MPC · JPL
84073	2002 PY_{158}	—	August 8, 2002	Palomar	S. F. Hönig	RAF	1.4 km	MPC · JPL
84074	2002 PN_{163}	—	August 8, 2002	Palomar	S. F. Hönig	·	2.7 km	MPC · JPL
84075 Peterpatricia	2002 PL_{165}	Peterpatricia	August 8, 2002	Palomar	Lowe, A.	KOR	2.1 km	MPC · JPL
84076	2002 QN	—	August 16, 2002	Socorro	LINEAR	·	6.6 km	MPC · JPL
84077	2002 QH_{1}	—	August 16, 2002	Socorro	LINEAR	·	2.3 km	MPC · JPL
84078	2002 QA_{2}	—	August 16, 2002	Palomar	NEAT	(5)	2.0 km	MPC · JPL
84079	2002 QD_{5}	—	August 16, 2002	Palomar	NEAT	V	1.2 km	MPC · JPL
84080	2002 QU_{7}	—	August 19, 2002	Haleakala	NEAT	·	3.2 km	MPC · JPL
84081	2002 QH_{9}	—	August 19, 2002	Palomar	NEAT	·	3.9 km	MPC · JPL
84082	2002 QA_{18}	—	August 28, 2002	Palomar	NEAT	·	1.6 km	MPC · JPL
84083	2002 QC_{18}	—	August 28, 2002	Palomar	NEAT	MAS	1.4 km	MPC · JPL
84084	2002 QT_{21}	—	August 26, 2002	Palomar	NEAT	NYS	1.9 km	MPC · JPL
84085	2002 QU_{24}	—	August 27, 2002	Socorro	LINEAR	EUP	11 km	MPC · JPL
84086	2002 QW_{26}	—	August 29, 2002	Palomar	NEAT	·	2.8 km	MPC · JPL
84087	2002 QR_{28}	—	August 29, 2002	Palomar	NEAT	·	3.2 km	MPC · JPL
84088	2002 QQ_{29}	—	August 29, 2002	Palomar	NEAT	·	1.2 km	MPC · JPL
84089	2002 QB_{38}	—	August 30, 2002	Kitt Peak	Spacewatch	·	2.8 km	MPC · JPL
84090	2002 QL_{40}	—	August 30, 2002	Palomar	NEAT	·	3.4 km	MPC · JPL
84091	2002 QM_{45}	—	August 31, 2002	Anderson Mesa	LONEOS	·	3.3 km	MPC · JPL
84092	2002 QR_{46}	—	August 31, 2002	Socorro	LINEAR	·	2.6 km	MPC · JPL
84093	2002 QS_{46}	—	August 27, 2002	Palomar	NEAT	RAF	1.9 km	MPC · JPL
84094	2002 QB_{47}	—	August 30, 2002	Socorro	LINEAR	JUN	2.7 km	MPC · JPL
84095 Davidjohn	2002 QV_{48}	Davidjohn	August 20, 2002	Palomar	R. Matson	·	4.1 km	MPC · JPL
84096 Reginaldglenice	2002 QD_{58}	Reginaldglenice	August 17, 2002	Palomar	Lowe, A.	·	1.4 km	MPC · JPL
84097	2002 RY_{1}	—	September 4, 2002	Anderson Mesa	LONEOS	·	2.9 km	MPC · JPL
84098	2002 RV_{2}	—	September 4, 2002	Anderson Mesa	LONEOS	·	2.4 km	MPC · JPL
84099	2002 RF_{3}	—	September 4, 2002	Anderson Mesa	LONEOS	MAS	1.8 km	MPC · JPL
84100 Farnocchia	2002 RP_{8}	Farnocchia	September 3, 2002	Campo Imperatore	CINEOS	·	5.3 km	MPC · JPL

== 84101–84200 ==
back to top

Designation			Discovery			Properties		Ref
Permanent	Provisional	Named after	Date	Site	Discoverer(s)	Category	Diam.	Ref
84101	2002 RQ_{9}	—	September 4, 2002	Palomar	NEAT	·	2.7 km	MPC · JPL
84102	2002 RX_{11}	—	September 4, 2002	Anderson Mesa	LONEOS	·	2.1 km	MPC · JPL
84103	2002 RH_{12}	—	September 4, 2002	Anderson Mesa	LONEOS	3:2	13 km	MPC · JPL
84104	2002 RN_{13}	—	September 4, 2002	Anderson Mesa	LONEOS	·	6.7 km	MPC · JPL
84105	2002 RA_{15}	—	September 4, 2002	Anderson Mesa	LONEOS	·	1.7 km	MPC · JPL
84106	2002 RD_{16}	—	September 4, 2002	Anderson Mesa	LONEOS	NYS	2.3 km	MPC · JPL
84107	2002 RV_{17}	—	September 4, 2002	Anderson Mesa	LONEOS	V	1.4 km	MPC · JPL
84108	2002 RA_{18}	—	September 4, 2002	Anderson Mesa	LONEOS	·	2.8 km	MPC · JPL
84109	2002 RB_{18}	—	September 4, 2002	Anderson Mesa	LONEOS	·	1.8 km	MPC · JPL
84110	2002 RQ_{18}	—	September 4, 2002	Anderson Mesa	LONEOS	GEF	2.1 km	MPC · JPL
84111	2002 RR_{19}	—	September 4, 2002	Anderson Mesa	LONEOS	·	1.7 km	MPC · JPL
84112	2002 RG_{21}	—	September 4, 2002	Anderson Mesa	LONEOS	·	2.2 km	MPC · JPL
84113	2002 RB_{23}	—	September 4, 2002	Anderson Mesa	LONEOS	·	1.8 km	MPC · JPL
84114	2002 RB_{25}	—	September 4, 2002	Anderson Mesa	LONEOS	·	3.4 km	MPC · JPL
84115	2002 RC_{25}	—	September 4, 2002	Anderson Mesa	LONEOS	·	1.9 km	MPC · JPL
84116	2002 RL_{25}	—	September 4, 2002	Anderson Mesa	LONEOS	LEO	4.8 km	MPC · JPL
84117	2002 RB_{26}	—	September 3, 2002	Haleakala	NEAT	·	3.3 km	MPC · JPL
84118 Bracalicioci	2002 RE_{26}	Bracalicioci	September 3, 2002	Campo Imperatore	F. Bernardi	·	2.4 km	MPC · JPL
84119 Sanitariitaliani	2002 RF_{26}	Sanitariitaliani	September 3, 2002	Campo Imperatore	CINEOS	·	3.3 km	MPC · JPL
84120 Antonacci	2002 RY_{27}	Antonacci	September 4, 2002	Campo Imperatore	F. Bernardi, M. Tombelli	EUN	2.2 km	MPC · JPL
84121	2002 RE_{28}	—	September 5, 2002	Socorro	LINEAR	·	3.0 km	MPC · JPL
84122	2002 RJ_{31}	—	September 4, 2002	Anderson Mesa	LONEOS	ERI	3.2 km	MPC · JPL
84123	2002 RR_{33}	—	September 4, 2002	Anderson Mesa	LONEOS	·	1.4 km	MPC · JPL
84124	2002 RW_{33}	—	September 4, 2002	Anderson Mesa	LONEOS	·	2.2 km	MPC · JPL
84125	2002 RL_{35}	—	September 4, 2002	Anderson Mesa	LONEOS	·	8.2 km	MPC · JPL
84126	2002 RC_{38}	—	September 5, 2002	Socorro	LINEAR	·	4.9 km	MPC · JPL
84127	2002 RG_{40}	—	September 5, 2002	Socorro	LINEAR	·	3.2 km	MPC · JPL
84128	2002 RF_{41}	—	September 5, 2002	Socorro	LINEAR	·	5.6 km	MPC · JPL
84129	2002 RP_{41}	—	September 5, 2002	Socorro	LINEAR	·	2.5 km	MPC · JPL
84130	2002 RF_{42}	—	September 5, 2002	Socorro	LINEAR	·	6.8 km	MPC · JPL
84131	2002 RE_{43}	—	September 5, 2002	Socorro	LINEAR	·	4.0 km	MPC · JPL
84132	2002 RH_{47}	—	September 5, 2002	Socorro	LINEAR	·	1.8 km	MPC · JPL
84133	2002 RX_{48}	—	September 5, 2002	Socorro	LINEAR	·	2.9 km	MPC · JPL
84134	2002 RN_{49}	—	September 5, 2002	Socorro	LINEAR	·	3.1 km	MPC · JPL
84135	2002 RD_{51}	—	September 5, 2002	Socorro	LINEAR	·	8.1 km	MPC · JPL
84136	2002 RK_{51}	—	September 5, 2002	Socorro	LINEAR	AGN	2.7 km	MPC · JPL
84137	2002 RT_{51}	—	September 5, 2002	Socorro	LINEAR	·	2.1 km	MPC · JPL
84138	2002 RT_{52}	—	September 5, 2002	Socorro	LINEAR	·	3.8 km	MPC · JPL
84139	2002 RF_{54}	—	September 5, 2002	Socorro	LINEAR	·	2.3 km	MPC · JPL
84140	2002 RE_{56}	—	September 5, 2002	Anderson Mesa	LONEOS	ADE	5.3 km	MPC · JPL
84141	2002 RQ_{57}	—	September 5, 2002	Anderson Mesa	LONEOS	·	5.1 km	MPC · JPL
84142	2002 RV_{58}	—	September 5, 2002	Socorro	LINEAR	·	7.9 km	MPC · JPL
84143	2002 RM_{59}	—	September 5, 2002	Socorro	LINEAR	·	2.8 km	MPC · JPL
84144	2002 RT_{59}	—	September 5, 2002	Socorro	LINEAR	·	2.0 km	MPC · JPL
84145	2002 RJ_{62}	—	September 5, 2002	Socorro	LINEAR	·	2.3 km	MPC · JPL
84146	2002 RW_{62}	—	September 5, 2002	Socorro	LINEAR	·	4.4 km	MPC · JPL
84147	2002 RL_{64}	—	September 5, 2002	Socorro	LINEAR	·	3.1 km	MPC · JPL
84148	2002 RB_{65}	—	September 5, 2002	Socorro	LINEAR	·	1.7 km	MPC · JPL
84149	2002 RU_{65}	—	September 5, 2002	Socorro	LINEAR	MRX	2.1 km	MPC · JPL
84150	2002 RJ_{68}	—	September 4, 2002	Anderson Mesa	LONEOS	V	1.7 km	MPC · JPL
84151	2002 RB_{73}	—	September 5, 2002	Socorro	LINEAR	·	1.3 km	MPC · JPL
84152	2002 RX_{78}	—	September 5, 2002	Socorro	LINEAR	·	2.2 km	MPC · JPL
84153	2002 RU_{80}	—	September 5, 2002	Socorro	LINEAR	EUN	2.3 km	MPC · JPL
84154	2002 RS_{81}	—	September 5, 2002	Socorro	LINEAR	MAS	1.6 km	MPC · JPL
84155	2002 RW_{82}	—	September 5, 2002	Socorro	LINEAR	·	2.4 km	MPC · JPL
84156	2002 RX_{82}	—	September 5, 2002	Socorro	LINEAR	·	4.4 km	MPC · JPL
84157	2002 RQ_{83}	—	September 5, 2002	Socorro	LINEAR	·	2.6 km	MPC · JPL
84158	2002 RM_{84}	—	September 5, 2002	Socorro	LINEAR	·	4.8 km	MPC · JPL
84159	2002 RP_{84}	—	September 5, 2002	Socorro	LINEAR	·	2.3 km	MPC · JPL
84160	2002 RV_{85}	—	September 5, 2002	Socorro	LINEAR	GEF	2.7 km	MPC · JPL
84161	2002 RT_{86}	—	September 5, 2002	Socorro	LINEAR	·	1.2 km	MPC · JPL
84162	2002 RC_{91}	—	September 5, 2002	Socorro	LINEAR	HNS	1.8 km	MPC · JPL
84163	2002 RL_{93}	—	September 5, 2002	Anderson Mesa	LONEOS	·	2.7 km	MPC · JPL
84164	2002 RW_{93}	—	September 5, 2002	Anderson Mesa	LONEOS	(5)	3.9 km	MPC · JPL
84165	2002 RM_{94}	—	September 5, 2002	Socorro	LINEAR	V	1.4 km	MPC · JPL
84166	2002 RP_{95}	—	September 5, 2002	Socorro	LINEAR	·	1.3 km	MPC · JPL
84167	2002 RT_{95}	—	September 5, 2002	Socorro	LINEAR	·	2.0 km	MPC · JPL
84168	2002 RU_{96}	—	September 5, 2002	Socorro	LINEAR	·	1.7 km	MPC · JPL
84169	2002 RC_{100}	—	September 5, 2002	Socorro	LINEAR	H	1.3 km	MPC · JPL
84170	2002 RD_{101}	—	September 5, 2002	Socorro	LINEAR	V	1.6 km	MPC · JPL
84171	2002 RQ_{101}	—	September 5, 2002	Socorro	LINEAR	·	1.7 km	MPC · JPL
84172	2002 RZ_{102}	—	September 5, 2002	Socorro	LINEAR	·	2.8 km	MPC · JPL
84173	2002 RA_{103}	—	September 5, 2002	Socorro	LINEAR	·	4.8 km	MPC · JPL
84174	2002 RV_{104}	—	September 5, 2002	Socorro	LINEAR	·	3.1 km	MPC · JPL
84175	2002 RA_{105}	—	September 5, 2002	Socorro	LINEAR	·	1.6 km	MPC · JPL
84176	2002 RD_{105}	—	September 5, 2002	Socorro	LINEAR	·	2.0 km	MPC · JPL
84177	2002 RM_{105}	—	September 5, 2002	Socorro	LINEAR	·	1.7 km	MPC · JPL
84178	2002 RO_{105}	—	September 5, 2002	Socorro	LINEAR	·	5.5 km	MPC · JPL
84179	2002 RR_{105}	—	September 5, 2002	Socorro	LINEAR	·	5.3 km	MPC · JPL
84180	2002 RT_{105}	—	September 5, 2002	Socorro	LINEAR	·	1.8 km	MPC · JPL
84181	2002 RK_{106}	—	September 5, 2002	Socorro	LINEAR	·	5.1 km	MPC · JPL
84182	2002 RM_{106}	—	September 5, 2002	Socorro	LINEAR	·	4.9 km	MPC · JPL
84183	2002 RE_{107}	—	September 5, 2002	Socorro	LINEAR	DOR	6.7 km	MPC · JPL
84184	2002 RF_{107}	—	September 5, 2002	Socorro	LINEAR	EUN	2.9 km	MPC · JPL
84185	2002 RM_{107}	—	September 5, 2002	Socorro	LINEAR	·	12 km	MPC · JPL
84186	2002 RQ_{107}	—	September 5, 2002	Socorro	LINEAR	·	2.5 km	MPC · JPL
84187	2002 RR_{107}	—	September 5, 2002	Socorro	LINEAR	(5)	2.7 km	MPC · JPL
84188	2002 RC_{108}	—	September 5, 2002	Socorro	LINEAR	·	3.7 km	MPC · JPL
84189	2002 RG_{108}	—	September 5, 2002	Socorro	LINEAR	·	3.2 km	MPC · JPL
84190	2002 RH_{109}	—	September 6, 2002	Socorro	LINEAR	V	1.1 km	MPC · JPL
84191	2002 RT_{109}	—	September 6, 2002	Socorro	LINEAR	·	1.7 km	MPC · JPL
84192	2002 RU_{113}	—	September 5, 2002	Socorro	LINEAR	·	3.1 km	MPC · JPL
84193	2002 RO_{114}	—	September 5, 2002	Socorro	LINEAR	·	1.3 km	MPC · JPL
84194	2002 RS_{116}	—	September 7, 2002	Socorro	LINEAR	·	3.1 km	MPC · JPL
84195	2002 RX_{116}	—	September 7, 2002	Socorro	LINEAR	·	1.9 km	MPC · JPL
84196	2002 RW_{117}	—	September 2, 2002	Kvistaberg	Uppsala-DLR Asteroid Survey	·	4.3 km	MPC · JPL
84197	2002 RB_{119}	—	September 5, 2002	Haleakala	NEAT	·	5.1 km	MPC · JPL
84198	2002 RQ_{120}	—	September 5, 2002	Socorro	LINEAR	·	2.0 km	MPC · JPL
84199	2002 RH_{122}	—	September 8, 2002	Haleakala	NEAT	·	2.1 km	MPC · JPL
84200 Robertmoore	2002 RM_{122}	Robertmoore	September 8, 2002	Haleakala	NEAT	·	8.0 km	MPC · JPL

== 84201–84300 ==
back to top

Designation			Discovery			Properties		Ref
Permanent	Provisional	Named after	Date	Site	Discoverer(s)	Category	Diam.	Ref
84201	2002 RB_{125}	—	September 7, 2002	Socorro	LINEAR	·	2.9 km	MPC · JPL
84202	2002 RF_{127}	—	September 10, 2002	Palomar	NEAT	HNS	2.7 km	MPC · JPL
84203	2002 RD_{133}	—	September 9, 2002	Haleakala	NEAT	H	1.3 km	MPC · JPL
84204	2002 RZ_{133}	—	September 10, 2002	Palomar	NEAT	·	1.9 km	MPC · JPL
84205	2002 RY_{134}	—	September 10, 2002	Haleakala	NEAT	·	1.5 km	MPC · JPL
84206	2002 RE_{136}	—	September 11, 2002	Haleakala	NEAT	·	2.3 km	MPC · JPL
84207	2002 RA_{138}	—	September 10, 2002	Haleakala	NEAT	·	5.4 km	MPC · JPL
84208	2002 RA_{139}	—	September 10, 2002	Palomar	NEAT	·	2.4 km	MPC · JPL
84209	2002 RS_{139}	—	September 10, 2002	Palomar	NEAT	·	3.5 km	MPC · JPL
84210	2002 RZ_{139}	—	September 10, 2002	Palomar	NEAT	·	5.8 km	MPC · JPL
84211	2002 RV_{141}	—	September 10, 2002	Haleakala	NEAT	·	2.4 km	MPC · JPL
84212	2002 RG_{149}	—	September 11, 2002	Haleakala	NEAT	PHO	2.1 km	MPC · JPL
84213	2002 RQ_{153}	—	September 13, 2002	Palomar	NEAT	PHO	1.6 km	MPC · JPL
84214	2002 RY_{167}	—	September 13, 2002	Palomar	NEAT	·	5.5 km	MPC · JPL
84215	2002 RP_{177}	—	September 13, 2002	Palomar	NEAT	·	8.4 km	MPC · JPL
84216	2002 RH_{179}	—	September 14, 2002	Kitt Peak	Spacewatch	·	2.0 km	MPC · JPL
84217	2002 RW_{179}	—	September 14, 2002	Kitt Peak	Spacewatch	·	4.0 km	MPC · JPL
84218	2002 RD_{180}	—	September 14, 2002	Kitt Peak	Spacewatch	CLA	2.9 km	MPC · JPL
84219	2002 RP_{186}	—	September 12, 2002	Palomar	NEAT	·	4.7 km	MPC · JPL
84220	2002 RY_{187}	—	September 12, 2002	Palomar	NEAT	THM	5.8 km	MPC · JPL
84221	2002 RN_{201}	—	September 13, 2002	Socorro	LINEAR	·	2.4 km	MPC · JPL
84222	2002 RR_{220}	—	September 15, 2002	Anderson Mesa	LONEOS	·	4.5 km	MPC · JPL
84223	2002 RL_{223}	—	September 13, 2002	Haleakala	NEAT	·	3.3 km	MPC · JPL
84224 Kyte	2002 RB_{233}	Kyte	September 9, 2002	Haleakala	R. Matson	·	1.3 km	MPC · JPL
84225 Verish	2002 RO_{236}	Verish	September 12, 2002	Palomar	R. Matson	·	1.7 km	MPC · JPL
84226	2002 SQ_{4}	—	September 27, 2002	Palomar	NEAT	V	1.2 km	MPC · JPL
84227	2002 SJ_{5}	—	September 27, 2002	Palomar	NEAT	NYS	1.7 km	MPC · JPL
84228	2002 SL_{12}	—	September 27, 2002	Palomar	NEAT	·	1.1 km	MPC · JPL
84229	2002 SH_{15}	—	September 27, 2002	Palomar	NEAT	PHO	2.3 km	MPC · JPL
84230	2002 SV_{16}	—	September 27, 2002	Palomar	NEAT	THM	5.5 km	MPC · JPL
84231	2002 SC_{17}	—	September 27, 2002	Socorro	LINEAR	·	3.9 km	MPC · JPL
84232	2002 SC_{20}	—	September 26, 2002	Palomar	NEAT	HYG	6.0 km	MPC · JPL
84233	2002 SO_{23}	—	September 27, 2002	Palomar	NEAT	·	1.8 km	MPC · JPL
84234	2002 SR_{24}	—	September 28, 2002	Palomar	NEAT	·	3.5 km	MPC · JPL
84235	2002 SP_{25}	—	September 28, 2002	Haleakala	NEAT	·	3.4 km	MPC · JPL
84236	2002 SP_{27}	—	September 29, 2002	Haleakala	NEAT	·	2.1 km	MPC · JPL
84237	2002 SZ_{29}	—	September 28, 2002	Haleakala	NEAT	·	1.2 km	MPC · JPL
84238	2002 SK_{30}	—	September 28, 2002	Haleakala	NEAT	·	2.8 km	MPC · JPL
84239	2002 SL_{32}	—	September 28, 2002	Haleakala	NEAT	·	5.5 km	MPC · JPL
84240	2002 SL_{33}	—	September 28, 2002	Haleakala	NEAT	·	1.7 km	MPC · JPL
84241	2002 SS_{33}	—	September 28, 2002	Haleakala	NEAT	MRX	2.8 km	MPC · JPL
84242	2002 ST_{34}	—	September 29, 2002	Haleakala	NEAT	·	1.8 km	MPC · JPL
84243	2002 SK_{35}	—	September 29, 2002	Haleakala	NEAT	(5)	2.0 km	MPC · JPL
84244	2002 ST_{35}	—	September 29, 2002	Haleakala	NEAT	·	1.5 km	MPC · JPL
84245	2002 SV_{35}	—	September 29, 2002	Haleakala	NEAT	·	1.5 km	MPC · JPL
84246	2002 SJ_{36}	—	September 29, 2002	Haleakala	NEAT	·	2.2 km	MPC · JPL
84247	2002 SL_{36}	—	September 29, 2002	Haleakala	NEAT	·	2.5 km	MPC · JPL
84248	2002 SN_{36}	—	September 29, 2002	Haleakala	NEAT	·	3.2 km	MPC · JPL
84249	2002 SR_{36}	—	September 29, 2002	Haleakala	NEAT	·	2.6 km	MPC · JPL
84250	2002 SX_{36}	—	September 29, 2002	Kitt Peak	Spacewatch	·	3.5 km	MPC · JPL
84251	2002 SG_{37}	—	September 29, 2002	Haleakala	NEAT	·	3.3 km	MPC · JPL
84252	2002 SL_{41}	—	September 30, 2002	Socorro	LINEAR	·	4.8 km	MPC · JPL
84253	2002 SG_{42}	—	September 28, 2002	Palomar	NEAT	·	1.2 km	MPC · JPL
84254	2002 SH_{42}	—	September 28, 2002	Palomar	NEAT	·	5.1 km	MPC · JPL
84255	2002 SF_{45}	—	September 29, 2002	Haleakala	NEAT	(21344)	2.7 km	MPC · JPL
84256	2002 SO_{45}	—	September 29, 2002	Kitt Peak	Spacewatch	·	1.6 km	MPC · JPL
84257	2002 SU_{45}	—	September 29, 2002	Kitt Peak	Spacewatch	·	1.4 km	MPC · JPL
84258	2002 SW_{45}	—	September 29, 2002	Kitt Peak	Spacewatch	·	4.3 km	MPC · JPL
84259	2002 ST_{46}	—	September 29, 2002	Haleakala	NEAT	EOS	3.9 km	MPC · JPL
84260	2002 SP_{50}	—	September 30, 2002	Haleakala	NEAT	·	2.6 km	MPC · JPL
84261	2002 SD_{51}	—	September 16, 2002	Haleakala	NEAT	·	9.1 km	MPC · JPL
84262	2002 SN_{54}	—	September 30, 2002	Socorro	LINEAR	·	2.5 km	MPC · JPL
84263	2002 TZ_{4}	—	October 1, 2002	Socorro	LINEAR	·	2.4 km	MPC · JPL
84264	2002 TG_{5}	—	October 1, 2002	Socorro	LINEAR	EOS	7.8 km	MPC · JPL
84265	2002 TO_{5}	—	October 1, 2002	Anderson Mesa	LONEOS	·	1.5 km	MPC · JPL
84266	2002 TS_{5}	—	October 1, 2002	Anderson Mesa	LONEOS	·	1.9 km	MPC · JPL
84267	2002 TF_{6}	—	October 1, 2002	Socorro	LINEAR	·	4.4 km	MPC · JPL
84268	2002 TU_{7}	—	October 1, 2002	Haleakala	NEAT	·	2.3 km	MPC · JPL
84269	2002 TY_{7}	—	October 1, 2002	Haleakala	NEAT	EOS	4.2 km	MPC · JPL
84270	2002 TT_{8}	—	October 1, 2002	Haleakala	NEAT	·	4.1 km	MPC · JPL
84271	2002 TU_{8}	—	October 1, 2002	Haleakala	NEAT	·	4.6 km	MPC · JPL
84272	2002 TH_{10}	—	October 2, 2002	Socorro	LINEAR	·	4.7 km	MPC · JPL
84273	2002 TF_{11}	—	October 1, 2002	Anderson Mesa	LONEOS	·	2.2 km	MPC · JPL
84274	2002 TY_{13}	—	October 1, 2002	Socorro	LINEAR	·	3.2 km	MPC · JPL
84275	2002 TF_{14}	—	October 1, 2002	Socorro	LINEAR	·	7.5 km	MPC · JPL
84276	2002 TX_{16}	—	October 2, 2002	Socorro	LINEAR	·	2.5 km	MPC · JPL
84277	2002 TZ_{16}	—	October 2, 2002	Socorro	LINEAR	·	4.1 km	MPC · JPL
84278	2002 TR_{20}	—	October 2, 2002	Socorro	LINEAR	EOS	3.5 km	MPC · JPL
84279	2002 TS_{20}	—	October 2, 2002	Socorro	LINEAR	·	1.8 km	MPC · JPL
84280	2002 TZ_{20}	—	October 2, 2002	Socorro	LINEAR	·	3.9 km	MPC · JPL
84281	2002 TS_{22}	—	October 2, 2002	Socorro	LINEAR	·	1.5 km	MPC · JPL
84282	2002 TV_{23}	—	October 2, 2002	Socorro	LINEAR	·	2.5 km	MPC · JPL
84283	2002 TN_{24}	—	October 2, 2002	Socorro	LINEAR	NYS	2.2 km	MPC · JPL
84284	2002 TQ_{26}	—	October 2, 2002	Socorro	LINEAR	·	2.2 km	MPC · JPL
84285	2002 TB_{27}	—	October 2, 2002	Socorro	LINEAR	KOR	2.8 km	MPC · JPL
84286	2002 TH_{27}	—	October 2, 2002	Socorro	LINEAR	·	3.7 km	MPC · JPL
84287	2002 TQ_{28}	—	October 2, 2002	Socorro	LINEAR	BRA	3.2 km	MPC · JPL
84288	2002 TF_{29}	—	October 2, 2002	Socorro	LINEAR	·	2.6 km	MPC · JPL
84289	2002 TK_{29}	—	October 2, 2002	Socorro	LINEAR	EOS	4.0 km	MPC · JPL
84290	2002 TA_{30}	—	October 2, 2002	Socorro	LINEAR	·	4.4 km	MPC · JPL
84291	2002 TC_{32}	—	October 2, 2002	Socorro	LINEAR	·	2.2 km	MPC · JPL
84292	2002 TO_{32}	—	October 2, 2002	Socorro	LINEAR	·	1.9 km	MPC · JPL
84293	2002 TR_{32}	—	October 2, 2002	Socorro	LINEAR	·	2.0 km	MPC · JPL
84294	2002 TJ_{33}	—	October 2, 2002	Socorro	LINEAR	AGN	1.9 km	MPC · JPL
84295	2002 TX_{33}	—	October 2, 2002	Socorro	LINEAR	·	1.5 km	MPC · JPL
84296	2002 TM_{36}	—	October 2, 2002	Socorro	LINEAR	(5)	2.7 km	MPC · JPL
84297	2002 TW_{36}	—	October 2, 2002	Socorro	LINEAR	HYG	6.1 km	MPC · JPL
84298	2002 TB_{38}	—	October 2, 2002	Socorro	LINEAR	PAD	6.2 km	MPC · JPL
84299	2002 TS_{38}	—	October 2, 2002	Socorro	LINEAR	·	3.8 km	MPC · JPL
84300	2002 TT_{38}	—	October 2, 2002	Socorro	LINEAR	WIT	2.8 km	MPC · JPL

== 84301–84400 ==
back to top

Designation			Discovery			Properties		Ref
Permanent	Provisional	Named after	Date	Site	Discoverer(s)	Category	Diam.	Ref
84301	2002 TA_{39}	—	October 2, 2002	Socorro	LINEAR	·	2.2 km	MPC · JPL
84302	2002 TB_{39}	—	October 2, 2002	Socorro	LINEAR	·	3.1 km	MPC · JPL
84303	2002 TX_{39}	—	October 2, 2002	Socorro	LINEAR	V	1.6 km	MPC · JPL
84304	2002 TB_{40}	—	October 2, 2002	Socorro	LINEAR	EOS	4.8 km	MPC · JPL
84305	2002 TH_{40}	—	October 2, 2002	Socorro	LINEAR	·	4.1 km	MPC · JPL
84306	2002 TT_{40}	—	October 2, 2002	Socorro	LINEAR	·	4.6 km	MPC · JPL
84307	2002 TU_{40}	—	October 2, 2002	Socorro	LINEAR	·	1.9 km	MPC · JPL
84308	2002 TV_{40}	—	October 2, 2002	Socorro	LINEAR	V	1.4 km	MPC · JPL
84309	2002 TW_{40}	—	October 2, 2002	Socorro	LINEAR	·	2.6 km	MPC · JPL
84310	2002 TD_{41}	—	October 2, 2002	Socorro	LINEAR	·	3.6 km	MPC · JPL
84311	2002 TE_{41}	—	October 2, 2002	Socorro	LINEAR	·	3.3 km	MPC · JPL
84312	2002 TH_{41}	—	October 2, 2002	Socorro	LINEAR	·	3.8 km	MPC · JPL
84313	2002 TP_{41}	—	October 2, 2002	Socorro	LINEAR	·	4.1 km	MPC · JPL
84314	2002 TQ_{41}	—	October 2, 2002	Socorro	LINEAR	·	1.5 km	MPC · JPL
84315	2002 TU_{41}	—	October 2, 2002	Socorro	LINEAR	·	4.4 km	MPC · JPL
84316	2002 TP_{43}	—	October 2, 2002	Socorro	LINEAR	·	5.5 km	MPC · JPL
84317	2002 TZ_{44}	—	October 2, 2002	Socorro	LINEAR	·	2.1 km	MPC · JPL
84318	2002 TN_{45}	—	October 2, 2002	Socorro	LINEAR	·	1.7 km	MPC · JPL
84319	2002 TX_{45}	—	October 2, 2002	Socorro	LINEAR	KOR	2.7 km	MPC · JPL
84320	2002 TU_{46}	—	October 2, 2002	Socorro	LINEAR	·	2.7 km	MPC · JPL
84321	2002 TB_{47}	—	October 2, 2002	Socorro	LINEAR	·	2.4 km	MPC · JPL
84322	2002 TZ_{47}	—	October 2, 2002	Socorro	LINEAR	·	3.7 km	MPC · JPL
84323	2002 TA_{48}	—	October 2, 2002	Socorro	LINEAR	·	3.0 km	MPC · JPL
84324	2002 TE_{48}	—	October 2, 2002	Socorro	LINEAR	HYG	7.1 km	MPC · JPL
84325	2002 TC_{49}	—	October 2, 2002	Socorro	LINEAR	URS	8.0 km	MPC · JPL
84326	2002 TZ_{49}	—	October 2, 2002	Socorro	LINEAR	EOS	4.8 km	MPC · JPL
84327	2002 TT_{50}	—	October 2, 2002	Socorro	LINEAR	·	5.4 km	MPC · JPL
84328	2002 TM_{51}	—	October 2, 2002	Socorro	LINEAR	V	1.7 km	MPC · JPL
84329	2002 TU_{51}	—	October 2, 2002	Socorro	LINEAR	·	3.3 km	MPC · JPL
84330	2002 TA_{52}	—	October 2, 2002	Socorro	LINEAR	·	1.9 km	MPC · JPL
84331	2002 TB_{53}	—	October 2, 2002	Socorro	LINEAR	·	2.6 km	MPC · JPL
84332	2002 TC_{53}	—	October 2, 2002	Socorro	LINEAR	·	4.5 km	MPC · JPL
84333	2002 TF_{53}	—	October 2, 2002	Socorro	LINEAR	·	4.9 km	MPC · JPL
84334	2002 TP_{53}	—	October 2, 2002	Socorro	LINEAR	·	7.0 km	MPC · JPL
84335	2002 TR_{53}	—	October 2, 2002	Socorro	LINEAR	·	2.3 km	MPC · JPL
84336	2002 TT_{53}	—	October 2, 2002	Socorro	LINEAR	·	2.7 km	MPC · JPL
84337	2002 TB_{54}	—	October 2, 2002	Socorro	LINEAR	·	1.7 km	MPC · JPL
84338	2002 TO_{57}	—	October 2, 2002	Socorro	LINEAR	·	1.7 km	MPC · JPL
84339 Francescaballi	2002 TR_{57}	Francescaballi	October 2, 2002	Campo Imperatore	F. Bernardi	·	3.8 km	MPC · JPL
84340 Jos	2002 TO_{58}	Jos	October 2, 2002	Needville	J. Dellinger	·	2.0 km	MPC · JPL
84341	2002 TG_{64}	—	October 4, 2002	Palomar	NEAT	·	3.0 km	MPC · JPL
84342 Rubensdeazevedo	2002 TP_{64}	Rubensdeazevedo	October 5, 2002	Fountain Hills	C. W. Juels, P. R. Holvorcem	·	1.4 km	MPC · JPL
84343	2002 TF_{65}	—	October 4, 2002	Palomar	NEAT	·	2.0 km	MPC · JPL
84344	2002 TM_{65}	—	October 5, 2002	Socorro	LINEAR	·	8.3 km	MPC · JPL
84345	2002 TO_{71}	—	October 3, 2002	Palomar	NEAT	·	3.9 km	MPC · JPL
84346	2002 TQ_{71}	—	October 3, 2002	Palomar	NEAT	ADE	4.5 km	MPC · JPL
84347	2002 TC_{72}	—	October 3, 2002	Palomar	NEAT	·	2.2 km	MPC · JPL
84348	2002 TQ_{72}	—	October 3, 2002	Palomar	NEAT	·	2.5 km	MPC · JPL
84349	2002 TF_{76}	—	October 1, 2002	Anderson Mesa	LONEOS	·	2.6 km	MPC · JPL
84350	2002 TA_{77}	—	October 1, 2002	Anderson Mesa	LONEOS	·	5.9 km	MPC · JPL
84351	2002 TE_{77}	—	October 1, 2002	Anderson Mesa	LONEOS	·	1.9 km	MPC · JPL
84352	2002 TW_{78}	—	October 1, 2002	Socorro	LINEAR	·	2.8 km	MPC · JPL
84353	2002 TU_{79}	—	October 1, 2002	Socorro	LINEAR	·	2.7 km	MPC · JPL
84354	2002 TE_{80}	—	October 1, 2002	Socorro	LINEAR	EUN	3.2 km	MPC · JPL
84355	2002 TY_{80}	—	October 1, 2002	Socorro	LINEAR	V	1.5 km	MPC · JPL
84356	2002 TG_{82}	—	October 1, 2002	Črni Vrh	Mikuž, H.	·	2.8 km	MPC · JPL
84357	2002 TH_{82}	—	October 1, 2002	Črni Vrh	Mikuž, H.	V	1.6 km	MPC · JPL
84358	2002 TC_{83}	—	October 2, 2002	Haleakala	NEAT	·	3.8 km	MPC · JPL
84359	2002 TQ_{83}	—	October 2, 2002	Haleakala	NEAT	·	2.8 km	MPC · JPL
84360	2002 TW_{83}	—	October 2, 2002	Haleakala	NEAT	·	4.4 km	MPC · JPL
84361	2002 TE_{84}	—	October 2, 2002	Haleakala	NEAT	V	1.3 km	MPC · JPL
84362	2002 TQ_{90}	—	October 3, 2002	Palomar	NEAT	·	3.6 km	MPC · JPL
84363	2002 TO_{95}	—	October 3, 2002	Palomar	NEAT	·	5.5 km	MPC · JPL
84364	2002 TN_{97}	—	October 2, 2002	Haleakala	NEAT	JUN	2.2 km	MPC · JPL
84365	2002 TC_{112}	—	October 3, 2002	Socorro	LINEAR	CYB	9.0 km	MPC · JPL
84366	2002 TD_{112}	—	October 3, 2002	Socorro	LINEAR	·	2.3 km	MPC · JPL
84367	2002 TL_{114}	—	October 3, 2002	Palomar	NEAT	·	6.0 km	MPC · JPL
84368	2002 TE_{116}	—	October 3, 2002	Palomar	NEAT	·	1.9 km	MPC · JPL
84369	2002 TU_{120}	—	October 3, 2002	Palomar	NEAT	·	4.3 km	MPC · JPL
84370	2002 TW_{121}	—	October 3, 2002	Palomar	NEAT	·	9.2 km	MPC · JPL
84371	2002 TY_{128}	—	October 4, 2002	Palomar	NEAT	·	2.1 km	MPC · JPL
84372	2002 TK_{129}	—	October 4, 2002	Palomar	NEAT	·	1.5 km	MPC · JPL
84373	2002 TR_{129}	—	October 4, 2002	Palomar	NEAT	·	3.1 km	MPC · JPL
84374	2002 TB_{132}	—	October 4, 2002	Socorro	LINEAR	EUN	2.3 km	MPC · JPL
84375	2002 TL_{135}	—	October 4, 2002	Socorro	LINEAR	(31811)	5.2 km	MPC · JPL
84376	2002 TO_{135}	—	October 4, 2002	Socorro	LINEAR	·	2.4 km	MPC · JPL
84377	2002 TF_{136}	—	October 4, 2002	Anderson Mesa	LONEOS	·	4.5 km	MPC · JPL
84378	2002 TX_{137}	—	October 4, 2002	Anderson Mesa	LONEOS	V	1.3 km	MPC · JPL
84379	2002 TB_{138}	—	October 4, 2002	Anderson Mesa	LONEOS	·	2.2 km	MPC · JPL
84380	2002 TJ_{138}	—	October 4, 2002	Anderson Mesa	LONEOS	·	2.2 km	MPC · JPL
84381	2002 TJ_{139}	—	October 4, 2002	Anderson Mesa	LONEOS	·	8.3 km	MPC · JPL
84382	2002 TY_{139}	—	October 4, 2002	Anderson Mesa	LONEOS	DOR	6.6 km	MPC · JPL
84383	2002 TX_{142}	—	October 4, 2002	Socorro	LINEAR	·	2.2 km	MPC · JPL
84384	2002 TK_{143}	—	October 4, 2002	Socorro	LINEAR	DOR	5.8 km	MPC · JPL
84385	2002 TB_{144}	—	October 4, 2002	Socorro	LINEAR	·	6.2 km	MPC · JPL
84386	2002 TD_{144}	—	October 4, 2002	Socorro	LINEAR	·	1.4 km	MPC · JPL
84387	2002 TA_{158}	—	October 5, 2002	Socorro	LINEAR	·	3.9 km	MPC · JPL
84388	2002 TD_{158}	—	October 5, 2002	Palomar	NEAT	·	4.7 km	MPC · JPL
84389	2002 TO_{160}	—	October 5, 2002	Palomar	NEAT	MAR	2.9 km	MPC · JPL
84390	2002 TK_{161}	—	October 5, 2002	Palomar	NEAT	·	2.9 km	MPC · JPL
84391	2002 TS_{161}	—	October 5, 2002	Palomar	NEAT	EUN	3.0 km	MPC · JPL
84392	2002 TV_{161}	—	October 5, 2002	Palomar	NEAT	PHO	1.7 km	MPC · JPL
84393	2002 TO_{162}	—	October 5, 2002	Palomar	NEAT	·	2.9 km	MPC · JPL
84394	2002 TD_{174}	—	October 4, 2002	Socorro	LINEAR	·	1.6 km	MPC · JPL
84395	2002 TL_{176}	—	October 5, 2002	Socorro	LINEAR	V	1.3 km	MPC · JPL
84396	2002 TM_{176}	—	October 5, 2002	Socorro	LINEAR	·	4.1 km	MPC · JPL
84397	2002 TP_{178}	—	October 12, 2002	Socorro	LINEAR	·	4.6 km	MPC · JPL
84398	2002 TC_{179}	—	October 13, 2002	Palomar	NEAT	·	7.9 km	MPC · JPL
84399	2002 TV_{179}	—	October 14, 2002	Socorro	LINEAR	·	3.8 km	MPC · JPL
84400	2002 TX_{179}	—	October 14, 2002	Socorro	LINEAR	MAR	3.3 km	MPC · JPL

== 84401–84500 ==
back to top

Designation			Discovery			Properties		Ref
Permanent	Provisional	Named after	Date	Site	Discoverer(s)	Category	Diam.	Ref
84401	2002 TZ_{179}	—	October 14, 2002	Socorro	LINEAR	WAT	5.0 km	MPC · JPL
84402	2002 TD_{180}	—	October 14, 2002	Socorro	LINEAR	·	4.5 km	MPC · JPL
84403	2002 TA_{181}	—	October 14, 2002	Socorro	LINEAR	·	4.4 km	MPC · JPL
84404	2002 TB_{181}	—	October 14, 2002	Socorro	LINEAR	(6355)	12 km	MPC · JPL
84405	2002 TD_{181}	—	October 14, 2002	Socorro	LINEAR	·	5.8 km	MPC · JPL
84406	2002 TK_{181}	—	October 3, 2002	Socorro	LINEAR	·	1.5 km	MPC · JPL
84407	2002 TU_{181}	—	October 3, 2002	Socorro	LINEAR	·	4.8 km	MPC · JPL
84408	2002 TV_{181}	—	October 3, 2002	Socorro	LINEAR	·	5.0 km	MPC · JPL
84409	2002 TN_{183}	—	October 4, 2002	Socorro	LINEAR	·	1.9 km	MPC · JPL
84410	2002 TA_{187}	—	October 4, 2002	Socorro	LINEAR	TIR	3.9 km	MPC · JPL
84411	2002 TC_{187}	—	October 4, 2002	Socorro	LINEAR	·	2.0 km	MPC · JPL
84412	2002 TR_{188}	—	October 4, 2002	Socorro	LINEAR	·	2.5 km	MPC · JPL
84413	2002 TU_{191}	—	October 5, 2002	Anderson Mesa	LONEOS	·	4.1 km	MPC · JPL
84414	2002 TG_{195}	—	October 3, 2002	Socorro	LINEAR	·	4.9 km	MPC · JPL
84415	2002 TL_{195}	—	October 3, 2002	Socorro	LINEAR	·	3.5 km	MPC · JPL
84416	2002 TU_{195}	—	October 3, 2002	Socorro	LINEAR	EUN	3.2 km	MPC · JPL
84417 Ritabo	2002 TE_{202}	Ritabo	October 5, 2002	Coddenham	T. Boles	·	5.3 km	MPC · JPL
84418	2002 TX_{206}	—	October 4, 2002	Socorro	LINEAR	·	5.8 km	MPC · JPL
84419	2002 TE_{207}	—	October 4, 2002	Socorro	LINEAR	·	2.7 km	MPC · JPL
84420	2002 TL_{207}	—	October 4, 2002	Socorro	LINEAR	HYG	4.4 km	MPC · JPL
84421	2002 TT_{207}	—	October 4, 2002	Socorro	LINEAR	·	1.5 km	MPC · JPL
84422	2002 TN_{209}	—	October 6, 2002	Haleakala	NEAT	·	2.3 km	MPC · JPL
84423	2002 TQ_{209}	—	October 6, 2002	Haleakala	NEAT	·	6.9 km	MPC · JPL
84424	2002 TB_{210}	—	October 7, 2002	Socorro	LINEAR	HYG	8.0 km	MPC · JPL
84425	2002 TU_{215}	—	October 5, 2002	Socorro	LINEAR	MAR	3.3 km	MPC · JPL
84426	2002 TP_{218}	—	October 5, 2002	Socorro	LINEAR	·	2.9 km	MPC · JPL
84427	2002 TQ_{222}	—	October 7, 2002	Socorro	LINEAR	·	2.8 km	MPC · JPL
84428	2002 TJ_{223}	—	October 7, 2002	Anderson Mesa	LONEOS	·	2.2 km	MPC · JPL
84429	2002 TW_{223}	—	October 7, 2002	Socorro	LINEAR	·	1.6 km	MPC · JPL
84430	2002 TL_{224}	—	October 8, 2002	Anderson Mesa	LONEOS	PHO	2.0 km	MPC · JPL
84431	2002 TD_{225}	—	October 8, 2002	Anderson Mesa	LONEOS	·	2.8 km	MPC · JPL
84432	2002 TR_{226}	—	October 8, 2002	Anderson Mesa	LONEOS	TEL	2.6 km	MPC · JPL
84433	2002 TY_{226}	—	October 8, 2002	Anderson Mesa	LONEOS	·	2.5 km	MPC · JPL
84434	2002 TD_{227}	—	October 8, 2002	Anderson Mesa	LONEOS	·	1.8 km	MPC · JPL
84435	2002 TH_{227}	—	October 8, 2002	Anderson Mesa	LONEOS	·	2.8 km	MPC · JPL
84436	2002 TU_{228}	—	October 7, 2002	Haleakala	NEAT	EUN	2.8 km	MPC · JPL
84437	2002 TW_{231}	—	October 8, 2002	Palomar	NEAT	MAR	2.4 km	MPC · JPL
84438	2002 TU_{233}	—	October 6, 2002	Socorro	LINEAR	·	3.6 km	MPC · JPL
84439	2002 TW_{233}	—	October 6, 2002	Socorro	LINEAR	·	4.5 km	MPC · JPL
84440	2002 TE_{234}	—	October 6, 2002	Socorro	LINEAR	EUN	3.3 km	MPC · JPL
84441	2002 TK_{235}	—	October 6, 2002	Socorro	LINEAR	·	4.7 km	MPC · JPL
84442	2002 TL_{235}	—	October 6, 2002	Socorro	LINEAR	ADE	7.1 km	MPC · JPL
84443	2002 TF_{236}	—	October 6, 2002	Socorro	LINEAR	·	4.1 km	MPC · JPL
84444	2002 TM_{238}	—	October 7, 2002	Anderson Mesa	LONEOS	(5)	1.9 km	MPC · JPL
84445	2002 TZ_{239}	—	October 9, 2002	Socorro	LINEAR	·	9.9 km	MPC · JPL
84446	2002 TN_{240}	—	October 9, 2002	Socorro	LINEAR	·	3.5 km	MPC · JPL
84447 Jeffkanipe	2002 TU_{240}	Jeffkanipe	October 6, 2002	Haleakala	NEAT	·	2.6 km	MPC · JPL
84448	2002 TX_{240}	—	October 6, 2002	Haleakala	NEAT	EOS	4.1 km	MPC · JPL
84449	2002 TA_{241}	—	October 7, 2002	Socorro	LINEAR	·	3.7 km	MPC · JPL
84450	2002 TZ_{241}	—	October 8, 2002	Anderson Mesa	LONEOS	fast	1.5 km	MPC · JPL
84451	2002 TP_{242}	—	October 9, 2002	Socorro	LINEAR	EOS	3.2 km	MPC · JPL
84452	2002 TQ_{248}	—	October 7, 2002	Socorro	LINEAR	·	6.1 km	MPC · JPL
84453	2002 TU_{248}	—	October 7, 2002	Socorro	LINEAR	V	1.2 km	MPC · JPL
84454	2002 TN_{250}	—	October 7, 2002	Anderson Mesa	LONEOS	·	3.8 km	MPC · JPL
84455	2002 TO_{250}	—	October 7, 2002	Anderson Mesa	LONEOS	·	5.0 km	MPC · JPL
84456	2002 TR_{250}	—	October 7, 2002	Socorro	LINEAR	(12739)	3.3 km	MPC · JPL
84457	2002 TY_{250}	—	October 7, 2002	Socorro	LINEAR	EOS	4.7 km	MPC · JPL
84458	2002 TB_{251}	—	October 7, 2002	Socorro	LINEAR	V	1.2 km	MPC · JPL
84459	2002 TG_{251}	—	October 7, 2002	Haleakala	NEAT	(5)	5.1 km	MPC · JPL
84460	2002 TH_{254}	—	October 9, 2002	Anderson Mesa	LONEOS	·	1.5 km	MPC · JPL
84461	2002 TQ_{254}	—	October 9, 2002	Anderson Mesa	LONEOS	·	2.1 km	MPC · JPL
84462	2002 TW_{255}	—	October 9, 2002	Socorro	LINEAR	·	2.9 km	MPC · JPL
84463	2002 TZ_{255}	—	October 9, 2002	Socorro	LINEAR	·	2.2 km	MPC · JPL
84464	2002 TT_{256}	—	October 9, 2002	Socorro	LINEAR	·	5.5 km	MPC · JPL
84465	2002 TO_{257}	—	October 9, 2002	Socorro	LINEAR	KOR	3.1 km	MPC · JPL
84466	2002 TV_{257}	—	October 9, 2002	Socorro	LINEAR	·	2.9 km	MPC · JPL
84467	2002 TX_{258}	—	October 9, 2002	Socorro	LINEAR	·	1.7 km	MPC · JPL
84468	2002 TY_{258}	—	October 9, 2002	Socorro	LINEAR	·	3.0 km	MPC · JPL
84469	2002 TL_{259}	—	October 9, 2002	Socorro	LINEAR	(5)	3.0 km	MPC · JPL
84470	2002 TB_{260}	—	October 9, 2002	Socorro	LINEAR	EUN	2.0 km	MPC · JPL
84471	2002 TD_{260}	—	October 9, 2002	Socorro	LINEAR	WIT	2.2 km	MPC · JPL
84472	2002 TZ_{260}	—	October 9, 2002	Socorro	LINEAR	·	1.9 km	MPC · JPL
84473	2002 TP_{261}	—	October 9, 2002	Socorro	LINEAR	·	3.5 km	MPC · JPL
84474	2002 TX_{263}	—	October 10, 2002	Socorro	LINEAR	·	1.8 km	MPC · JPL
84475	2002 TJ_{264}	—	October 10, 2002	Socorro	LINEAR	·	3.1 km	MPC · JPL
84476	2002 TR_{264}	—	October 10, 2002	Socorro	LINEAR	·	4.0 km	MPC · JPL
84477	2002 TF_{265}	—	October 10, 2002	Socorro	LINEAR	·	2.1 km	MPC · JPL
84478	2002 TC_{266}	—	October 10, 2002	Socorro	LINEAR	·	3.2 km	MPC · JPL
84479	2002 TK_{266}	—	October 10, 2002	Socorro	LINEAR	·	3.7 km	MPC · JPL
84480	2002 TM_{266}	—	October 10, 2002	Socorro	LINEAR	·	4.9 km	MPC · JPL
84481	2002 TB_{267}	—	October 10, 2002	Socorro	LINEAR	·	3.7 km	MPC · JPL
84482	2002 TW_{267}	—	October 9, 2002	Socorro	LINEAR	·	2.9 km	MPC · JPL
84483	2002 TU_{269}	—	October 9, 2002	Socorro	LINEAR	·	1.6 km	MPC · JPL
84484	2002 TY_{270}	—	October 9, 2002	Socorro	LINEAR	MAR	2.6 km	MPC · JPL
84485	2002 TY_{273}	—	October 9, 2002	Socorro	LINEAR	·	1.4 km	MPC · JPL
84486	2002 TY_{275}	—	October 9, 2002	Socorro	LINEAR	V	1.3 km	MPC · JPL
84487	2002 TZ_{275}	—	October 9, 2002	Socorro	LINEAR	·	3.4 km	MPC · JPL
84488	2002 TV_{276}	—	October 9, 2002	Socorro	LINEAR	PAD	4.5 km	MPC · JPL
84489	2002 TT_{277}	—	October 10, 2002	Socorro	LINEAR	·	2.4 km	MPC · JPL
84490	2002 TK_{280}	—	October 10, 2002	Socorro	LINEAR	V	1.4 km	MPC · JPL
84491	2002 TR_{280}	—	October 10, 2002	Socorro	LINEAR	·	1.7 km	MPC · JPL
84492	2002 TF_{281}	—	October 10, 2002	Socorro	LINEAR	·	3.1 km	MPC · JPL
84493	2002 TK_{282}	—	October 10, 2002	Socorro	LINEAR	·	1.7 km	MPC · JPL
84494	2002 TT_{282}	—	October 10, 2002	Socorro	LINEAR	·	4.9 km	MPC · JPL
84495	2002 TC_{283}	—	October 10, 2002	Socorro	LINEAR	·	2.8 km	MPC · JPL
84496	2002 TJ_{283}	—	October 10, 2002	Socorro	LINEAR	·	2.1 km	MPC · JPL
84497	2002 TR_{283}	—	October 10, 2002	Socorro	LINEAR	·	5.9 km	MPC · JPL
84498	2002 TB_{284}	—	October 10, 2002	Socorro	LINEAR	·	3.4 km	MPC · JPL
84499	2002 TE_{285}	—	October 10, 2002	Socorro	LINEAR	V	1.3 km	MPC · JPL
84500	2002 TG_{285}	—	October 10, 2002	Socorro	LINEAR	·	2.0 km	MPC · JPL

== 84501–84600 ==
back to top

Designation			Discovery			Properties		Ref
Permanent	Provisional	Named after	Date	Site	Discoverer(s)	Category	Diam.	Ref
84501	2002 TH_{285}	—	October 10, 2002	Socorro	LINEAR	·	3.7 km	MPC · JPL
84502	2002 TO_{285}	—	October 10, 2002	Socorro	LINEAR	·	4.9 km	MPC · JPL
84503	2002 TX_{285}	—	October 10, 2002	Socorro	LINEAR	·	3.1 km	MPC · JPL
84504	2002 TL_{286}	—	October 10, 2002	Socorro	LINEAR	NYS	2.1 km	MPC · JPL
84505	2002 TP_{287}	—	October 10, 2002	Socorro	LINEAR	·	2.9 km	MPC · JPL
84506	2002 TE_{288}	—	October 10, 2002	Socorro	LINEAR	·	2.2 km	MPC · JPL
84507	2002 TN_{288}	—	October 10, 2002	Socorro	LINEAR	EUN	2.8 km	MPC · JPL
84508	2002 TQ_{288}	—	October 10, 2002	Socorro	LINEAR	·	6.0 km	MPC · JPL
84509	2002 TZ_{288}	—	October 10, 2002	Socorro	LINEAR	(5)	2.4 km	MPC · JPL
84510	2002 TA_{290}	—	October 10, 2002	Socorro	LINEAR	AGN	2.6 km	MPC · JPL
84511	2002 TH_{290}	—	October 10, 2002	Socorro	LINEAR	EUN	3.7 km	MPC · JPL
84512	2002 TK_{291}	—	October 10, 2002	Socorro	LINEAR	MAR ·	4.1 km	MPC · JPL
84513	2002 TQ_{291}	—	October 10, 2002	Socorro	LINEAR	slow	4.3 km	MPC · JPL
84514	2002 TC_{292}	—	October 10, 2002	Socorro	LINEAR	·	4.9 km	MPC · JPL
84515	2002 TB_{293}	—	October 10, 2002	Socorro	LINEAR	·	6.3 km	MPC · JPL
84516	2002 TK_{293}	—	October 10, 2002	Socorro	LINEAR	·	6.5 km	MPC · JPL
84517	2002 TJ_{294}	—	October 11, 2002	Socorro	LINEAR	·	2.7 km	MPC · JPL
84518	2002 TD_{295}	—	October 13, 2002	Palomar	NEAT	HNS	3.8 km	MPC · JPL
84519	2002 TE_{295}	—	October 13, 2002	Palomar	NEAT	·	4.3 km	MPC · JPL
84520	2002 TQ_{296}	—	October 11, 2002	Socorro	LINEAR	·	1.3 km	MPC · JPL
84521	2002 TE_{300}	—	October 15, 2002	Socorro	LINEAR	V	1.7 km	MPC · JPL
84522	2002 TC_{302}	—	October 9, 2002	Palomar	Palomar	res · 2:5	500 km	MPC · JPL
84523	2002 UF_{2}	—	October 28, 2002	Palomar	NEAT	·	5.5 km	MPC · JPL
84524	2002 UN_{6}	—	October 28, 2002	Palomar	NEAT	·	1.5 km	MPC · JPL
84525	2002 UC_{7}	—	October 28, 2002	Palomar	NEAT	EOS	3.6 km	MPC · JPL
84526	2002 UE_{9}	—	October 28, 2002	Palomar	NEAT	EUN	2.7 km	MPC · JPL
84527	2002 UF_{9}	—	October 28, 2002	Palomar	NEAT	EUN	3.0 km	MPC · JPL
84528	2002 UP_{9}	—	October 28, 2002	Kitt Peak	Spacewatch	fast	4.7 km	MPC · JPL
84529	2002 UK_{10}	—	October 28, 2002	Haleakala	NEAT	·	2.1 km	MPC · JPL
84530	2002 UC_{11}	—	October 29, 2002	Kvistaberg	Uppsala-DLR Asteroid Survey	·	3.1 km	MPC · JPL
84531	2002 UW_{12}	—	October 28, 2002	Palomar	NEAT	·	7.3 km	MPC · JPL
84532	2002 UV_{14}	—	October 30, 2002	Socorro	LINEAR	(5)	3.1 km	MPC · JPL
84533	2002 UO_{16}	—	October 30, 2002	Palomar	NEAT	·	5.5 km	MPC · JPL
84534	2002 UR_{16}	—	October 30, 2002	Haleakala	NEAT	·	4.8 km	MPC · JPL
84535	2002 UU_{19}	—	October 30, 2002	Haleakala	NEAT	·	5.0 km	MPC · JPL
84536	2002 UV_{19}	—	October 30, 2002	Haleakala	NEAT	SUL	4.2 km	MPC · JPL
84537	2002 UJ_{20}	—	October 28, 2002	Kitt Peak	Spacewatch	NYS	1.9 km	MPC · JPL
84538	2002 UM_{21}	—	October 30, 2002	Palomar	NEAT	·	2.6 km	MPC · JPL
84539	2002 UR_{22}	—	October 30, 2002	Haleakala	NEAT	·	1.8 km	MPC · JPL
84540	2002 UC_{26}	—	October 30, 2002	Palomar	NEAT	·	3.6 km	MPC · JPL
84541	2002 UH_{26}	—	October 31, 2002	Socorro	LINEAR	V	1.3 km	MPC · JPL
84542	2002 UB_{27}	—	October 31, 2002	Anderson Mesa	LONEOS	(5)	2.0 km	MPC · JPL
84543	2002 UJ_{28}	—	October 30, 2002	Palomar	NEAT	·	3.9 km	MPC · JPL
84544	2002 UC_{29}	—	October 31, 2002	Socorro	LINEAR	·	4.0 km	MPC · JPL
84545	2002 UK_{29}	—	October 31, 2002	Palomar	NEAT	·	1.8 km	MPC · JPL
84546	2002 UR_{29}	—	October 31, 2002	Palomar	NEAT	·	2.9 km	MPC · JPL
84547	2002 UX_{30}	—	October 30, 2002	Haleakala	NEAT	GEF	2.6 km	MPC · JPL
84548	2002 UJ_{32}	—	October 30, 2002	Haleakala	NEAT	V	1.5 km	MPC · JPL
84549	2002 UJ_{33}	—	October 31, 2002	Anderson Mesa	LONEOS	GEF	2.5 km	MPC · JPL
84550	2002 UN_{33}	—	October 31, 2002	Anderson Mesa	LONEOS	·	6.5 km	MPC · JPL
84551	2002 UP_{33}	—	October 31, 2002	Anderson Mesa	LONEOS	KOR	3.2 km	MPC · JPL
84552	2002 UT_{34}	—	October 31, 2002	Anderson Mesa	LONEOS	KOR	2.9 km	MPC · JPL
84553	2002 UK_{37}	—	October 31, 2002	Palomar	NEAT	·	2.9 km	MPC · JPL
84554	2002 UM_{38}	—	October 31, 2002	Anderson Mesa	LONEOS	KOR	2.7 km	MPC · JPL
84555	2002 UO_{40}	—	October 31, 2002	Socorro	LINEAR	·	3.0 km	MPC · JPL
84556	2002 UQ_{45}	—	October 31, 2002	Anderson Mesa	LONEOS	·	2.6 km	MPC · JPL
84557	2002 VC	—	November 1, 2002	Ametlla de Mar	Ametlla de Mar	EUN	3.2 km	MPC · JPL
84558	2002 VW_{3}	—	November 1, 2002	Palomar	NEAT	KOR	2.6 km	MPC · JPL
84559	2002 VY_{6}	—	November 1, 2002	Palomar	NEAT	·	3.0 km	MPC · JPL
84560	2002 VB_{7}	—	November 1, 2002	Palomar	NEAT	·	3.4 km	MPC · JPL
84561	2002 VH_{7}	—	November 4, 2002	Palomar	NEAT	·	4.3 km	MPC · JPL
84562	2002 VO_{7}	—	November 4, 2002	Haleakala	NEAT	·	5.2 km	MPC · JPL
84563	2002 VD_{8}	—	November 1, 2002	Palomar	NEAT	·	4.3 km	MPC · JPL
84564	2002 VT_{8}	—	November 1, 2002	Palomar	NEAT	V	1.3 km	MPC · JPL
84565	2002 VA_{9}	—	November 1, 2002	Socorro	LINEAR	V	1.6 km	MPC · JPL
84566 VIMS	2002 VS_{9}	VIMS	November 1, 2002	Palomar	NEAT	·	4.5 km	MPC · JPL
84567	2002 VX_{9}	—	November 1, 2002	Palomar	NEAT	·	4.5 km	MPC · JPL
84568	2002 VS_{10}	—	November 1, 2002	Palomar	NEAT	KOR	2.4 km	MPC · JPL
84569	2002 VC_{11}	—	November 1, 2002	Palomar	NEAT	·	2.3 km	MPC · JPL
84570	2002 VD_{11}	—	November 1, 2002	Palomar	NEAT	·	2.9 km	MPC · JPL
84571	2002 VR_{13}	—	November 4, 2002	Kitt Peak	Spacewatch	·	2.3 km	MPC · JPL
84572	2002 VJ_{14}	—	November 5, 2002	Anderson Mesa	LONEOS	·	2.0 km	MPC · JPL
84573	2002 VO_{15}	—	November 6, 2002	Socorro	LINEAR	·	4.2 km	MPC · JPL
84574	2002 VU_{15}	—	November 5, 2002	Socorro	LINEAR	·	4.9 km	MPC · JPL
84575	2002 VD_{16}	—	November 4, 2002	Kitt Peak	Spacewatch	CYB	7.2 km	MPC · JPL
84576	2002 VH_{16}	—	November 4, 2002	Kitt Peak	Spacewatch	·	4.7 km	MPC · JPL
84577	2002 VK_{16}	—	November 5, 2002	Socorro	LINEAR	·	1.6 km	MPC · JPL
84578	2002 VO_{17}	—	November 5, 2002	Socorro	LINEAR	·	3.1 km	MPC · JPL
84579	2002 VS_{18}	—	November 4, 2002	Anderson Mesa	LONEOS	·	3.0 km	MPC · JPL
84580	2002 VA_{20}	—	November 4, 2002	Kitt Peak	Spacewatch	·	3.7 km	MPC · JPL
84581	2002 VC_{20}	—	November 4, 2002	Kitt Peak	Spacewatch	PHO	2.3 km	MPC · JPL
84582	2002 VL_{24}	—	November 5, 2002	Socorro	LINEAR	·	7.6 km	MPC · JPL
84583	2002 VE_{27}	—	November 5, 2002	Socorro	LINEAR	·	3.3 km	MPC · JPL
84584	2002 VS_{27}	—	November 5, 2002	Anderson Mesa	LONEOS	·	2.8 km	MPC · JPL
84585	2002 VT_{27}	—	November 5, 2002	Anderson Mesa	LONEOS	·	5.5 km	MPC · JPL
84586	2002 VU_{27}	—	November 5, 2002	Anderson Mesa	LONEOS	·	3.6 km	MPC · JPL
84587	2002 VH_{28}	—	November 5, 2002	Anderson Mesa	LONEOS	·	4.2 km	MPC · JPL
84588	2002 VQ_{28}	—	November 5, 2002	Anderson Mesa	LONEOS	V	1.3 km	MPC · JPL
84589	2002 VR_{28}	—	November 5, 2002	Anderson Mesa	LONEOS	·	2.5 km	MPC · JPL
84590	2002 VS_{28}	—	November 5, 2002	Anderson Mesa	LONEOS	EUN	2.2 km	MPC · JPL
84591	2002 VN_{29}	—	November 5, 2002	Socorro	LINEAR	·	2.7 km	MPC · JPL
84592	2002 VP_{29}	—	November 5, 2002	Socorro	LINEAR	NAE	7.1 km	MPC · JPL
84593	2002 VL_{30}	—	November 5, 2002	Socorro	LINEAR	·	3.7 km	MPC · JPL
84594	2002 VO_{30}	—	November 5, 2002	Socorro	LINEAR	·	1.6 km	MPC · JPL
84595	2002 VP_{30}	—	November 5, 2002	Socorro	LINEAR	·	5.2 km	MPC · JPL
84596	2002 VT_{30}	—	November 5, 2002	Socorro	LINEAR	·	2.5 km	MPC · JPL
84597	2002 VD_{31}	—	November 5, 2002	Socorro	LINEAR	·	2.6 km	MPC · JPL
84598	2002 VM_{31}	—	November 5, 2002	Socorro	LINEAR	·	4.5 km	MPC · JPL
84599	2002 VT_{31}	—	November 5, 2002	Socorro	LINEAR	·	4.6 km	MPC · JPL
84600	2002 VH_{32}	—	November 5, 2002	Socorro	LINEAR	·	4.9 km	MPC · JPL

== 84601–84700 ==
back to top

Designation			Discovery			Properties		Ref
Permanent	Provisional	Named after	Date	Site	Discoverer(s)	Category	Diam.	Ref
84601	2002 VR_{32}	—	November 5, 2002	Socorro	LINEAR	·	3.8 km	MPC · JPL
84602	2002 VX_{32}	—	November 5, 2002	Socorro	LINEAR	·	3.3 km	MPC · JPL
84603	2002 VA_{33}	—	November 5, 2002	Socorro	LINEAR	·	2.7 km	MPC · JPL
84604	2002 VW_{33}	—	November 5, 2002	Socorro	LINEAR	·	8.1 km	MPC · JPL
84605	2002 VL_{34}	—	November 5, 2002	Socorro	LINEAR	MRX	2.3 km	MPC · JPL
84606	2002 VY_{34}	—	November 5, 2002	Kitt Peak	Spacewatch	HYG	6.9 km	MPC · JPL
84607	2002 VL_{35}	—	November 5, 2002	Socorro	LINEAR	KOR	3.1 km	MPC · JPL
84608	2002 VX_{35}	—	November 5, 2002	Kitt Peak	Spacewatch	·	1.2 km	MPC · JPL
84609	2002 VE_{36}	—	November 5, 2002	Socorro	LINEAR	·	3.8 km	MPC · JPL
84610	2002 VX_{36}	—	November 2, 2002	Haleakala	NEAT	·	4.6 km	MPC · JPL
84611	2002 VA_{37}	—	November 2, 2002	Haleakala	NEAT	NEM	3.4 km	MPC · JPL
84612	2002 VB_{37}	—	November 2, 2002	Haleakala	NEAT	·	5.8 km	MPC · JPL
84613	2002 VX_{37}	—	November 5, 2002	Socorro	LINEAR	·	2.4 km	MPC · JPL
84614	2002 VE_{38}	—	November 5, 2002	Socorro	LINEAR	·	4.3 km	MPC · JPL
84615	2002 VY_{38}	—	November 5, 2002	Socorro	LINEAR	·	5.3 km	MPC · JPL
84616	2002 VZ_{38}	—	November 5, 2002	Socorro	LINEAR	·	1.6 km	MPC · JPL
84617	2002 VA_{39}	—	November 5, 2002	Socorro	LINEAR	·	4.8 km	MPC · JPL
84618	2002 VF_{40}	—	November 8, 2002	Kingsnake	J. V. McClusky	·	7.3 km	MPC · JPL
84619	2002 VL_{41}	—	November 4, 2002	Palomar	NEAT	·	1.6 km	MPC · JPL
84620	2002 VL_{43}	—	November 4, 2002	Palomar	NEAT	·	2.7 km	MPC · JPL
84621	2002 VD_{44}	—	November 4, 2002	Haleakala	NEAT	ADE	3.8 km	MPC · JPL
84622	2002 VL_{44}	—	November 4, 2002	Haleakala	NEAT	·	2.8 km	MPC · JPL
84623	2002 VU_{44}	—	November 4, 2002	Haleakala	NEAT	·	2.9 km	MPC · JPL
84624	2002 VR_{45}	—	November 5, 2002	Fountain Hills	Hills, Fountain	·	4.8 km	MPC · JPL
84625	2002 VR_{46}	—	November 5, 2002	Palomar	NEAT	·	2.4 km	MPC · JPL
84626	2002 VB_{47}	—	November 5, 2002	Palomar	NEAT	·	3.0 km	MPC · JPL
84627	2002 VH_{47}	—	November 5, 2002	Anderson Mesa	LONEOS	V	1.5 km	MPC · JPL
84628	2002 VB_{49}	—	November 5, 2002	Anderson Mesa	LONEOS	·	3.6 km	MPC · JPL
84629	2002 VD_{49}	—	November 5, 2002	Anderson Mesa	LONEOS	·	3.4 km	MPC · JPL
84630	2002 VZ_{49}	—	November 5, 2002	Anderson Mesa	LONEOS	ADE	5.6 km	MPC · JPL
84631	2002 VW_{51}	—	November 6, 2002	Anderson Mesa	LONEOS	PHO · slow	2.5 km	MPC · JPL
84632	2002 VN_{52}	—	November 6, 2002	Anderson Mesa	LONEOS	ADE	6.7 km	MPC · JPL
84633	2002 VF_{53}	—	November 6, 2002	Socorro	LINEAR	·	2.2 km	MPC · JPL
84634	2002 VL_{53}	—	November 6, 2002	Socorro	LINEAR	·	3.4 km	MPC · JPL
84635	2002 VD_{54}	—	November 6, 2002	Socorro	LINEAR	·	2.2 km	MPC · JPL
84636	2002 VX_{54}	—	November 6, 2002	Anderson Mesa	LONEOS	·	7.7 km	MPC · JPL
84637	2002 VG_{55}	—	November 6, 2002	Anderson Mesa	LONEOS	EUN	3.0 km	MPC · JPL
84638	2002 VO_{55}	—	November 6, 2002	Socorro	LINEAR	·	2.5 km	MPC · JPL
84639	2002 VQ_{55}	—	November 6, 2002	Socorro	LINEAR	·	1.4 km	MPC · JPL
84640	2002 VZ_{55}	—	November 6, 2002	Anderson Mesa	LONEOS	EOS	6.0 km	MPC · JPL
84641	2002 VE_{58}	—	November 6, 2002	Haleakala	NEAT	·	4.1 km	MPC · JPL
84642	2002 VQ_{58}	—	November 6, 2002	Haleakala	NEAT	·	1.8 km	MPC · JPL
84643	2002 VT_{58}	—	November 6, 2002	Haleakala	NEAT	MAR	2.9 km	MPC · JPL
84644	2002 VW_{58}	—	November 6, 2002	Haleakala	NEAT	AGN	2.3 km	MPC · JPL
84645	2002 VE_{59}	—	November 1, 2002	Socorro	LINEAR	·	2.2 km	MPC · JPL
84646	2002 VM_{60}	—	November 3, 2002	Haleakala	NEAT	HNS	3.4 km	MPC · JPL
84647	2002 VN_{60}	—	November 3, 2002	Haleakala	NEAT	·	5.8 km	MPC · JPL
84648	2002 VR_{60}	—	November 3, 2002	Haleakala	NEAT	URS	8.8 km	MPC · JPL
84649	2002 VL_{62}	—	November 5, 2002	Palomar	NEAT	·	3.5 km	MPC · JPL
84650	2002 VC_{66}	—	November 7, 2002	Kingsnake	J. V. McClusky	THM ·	4.3 km	MPC · JPL
84651	2002 VS_{66}	—	November 6, 2002	Socorro	LINEAR	·	3.7 km	MPC · JPL
84652	2002 VK_{68}	—	November 7, 2002	Socorro	LINEAR	·	5.8 km	MPC · JPL
84653	2002 VS_{68}	—	November 7, 2002	Anderson Mesa	LONEOS	EUN	2.9 km	MPC · JPL
84654	2002 VQ_{70}	—	November 7, 2002	Socorro	LINEAR	(2076)	2.5 km	MPC · JPL
84655	2002 VN_{73}	—	November 7, 2002	Socorro	LINEAR	·	2.6 km	MPC · JPL
84656	2002 VS_{74}	—	November 7, 2002	Socorro	LINEAR	·	2.6 km	MPC · JPL
84657	2002 VT_{76}	—	November 7, 2002	Socorro	LINEAR	NYS	3.3 km	MPC · JPL
84658	2002 VX_{76}	—	November 7, 2002	Socorro	LINEAR	KOR	2.9 km	MPC · JPL
84659	2002 VO_{78}	—	November 7, 2002	Socorro	LINEAR	V	1.5 km	MPC · JPL
84660	2002 VZ_{78}	—	November 7, 2002	Socorro	LINEAR	·	3.0 km	MPC · JPL
84661	2002 VA_{79}	—	November 7, 2002	Socorro	LINEAR	·	7.2 km	MPC · JPL
84662	2002 VU_{80}	—	November 7, 2002	Socorro	LINEAR	EOS	5.0 km	MPC · JPL
84663	2002 VW_{80}	—	November 7, 2002	Socorro	LINEAR	·	5.6 km	MPC · JPL
84664	2002 VG_{81}	—	November 7, 2002	Socorro	LINEAR	EUN	2.5 km	MPC · JPL
84665	2002 VZ_{81}	—	November 7, 2002	Socorro	LINEAR	·	3.1 km	MPC · JPL
84666	2002 VE_{82}	—	November 7, 2002	Socorro	LINEAR	·	2.5 km	MPC · JPL
84667	2002 VO_{82}	—	November 7, 2002	Socorro	LINEAR	·	1.8 km	MPC · JPL
84668	2002 VS_{82}	—	November 7, 2002	Socorro	LINEAR	V	2.0 km	MPC · JPL
84669	2002 VZ_{82}	—	November 7, 2002	Socorro	LINEAR	·	3.4 km	MPC · JPL
84670	2002 VF_{83}	—	November 7, 2002	Socorro	LINEAR	MAR	3.0 km	MPC · JPL
84671	2002 VS_{83}	—	November 7, 2002	Socorro	LINEAR	·	3.3 km	MPC · JPL
84672	2002 VG_{84}	—	November 7, 2002	Socorro	LINEAR	·	4.9 km	MPC · JPL
84673	2002 VW_{86}	—	November 8, 2002	Socorro	LINEAR	·	4.4 km	MPC · JPL
84674	2002 VT_{87}	—	November 8, 2002	Socorro	LINEAR	·	5.1 km	MPC · JPL
84675	2002 VW_{87}	—	November 8, 2002	Socorro	LINEAR	·	5.3 km	MPC · JPL
84676	2002 VM_{88}	—	November 11, 2002	Socorro	LINEAR	(5)	2.1 km	MPC · JPL
84677	2002 VT_{88}	—	November 11, 2002	Anderson Mesa	LONEOS	·	2.6 km	MPC · JPL
84678	2002 VW_{88}	—	November 11, 2002	Anderson Mesa	LONEOS	MRX	1.6 km	MPC · JPL
84679	2002 VC_{89}	—	November 11, 2002	Anderson Mesa	LONEOS	·	4.3 km	MPC · JPL
84680	2002 VN_{89}	—	November 11, 2002	Socorro	LINEAR	LUT	9.7 km	MPC · JPL
84681	2002 VR_{89}	—	November 11, 2002	Palomar	NEAT	·	4.4 km	MPC · JPL
84682	2002 VN_{94}	—	November 12, 2002	Socorro	LINEAR	·	3.4 km	MPC · JPL
84683	2002 VT_{95}	—	November 11, 2002	Fountain Hills	Hills, Fountain	·	6.1 km	MPC · JPL
84684	2002 VO_{100}	—	November 11, 2002	Anderson Mesa	LONEOS	GEF	7.0 km	MPC · JPL
84685	2002 VB_{102}	—	November 11, 2002	Socorro	LINEAR	·	8.7 km	MPC · JPL
84686	2002 VG_{102}	—	November 12, 2002	Kvistaberg	Uppsala-DLR Asteroid Survey	·	3.8 km	MPC · JPL
84687	2002 VK_{102}	—	November 12, 2002	Socorro	LINEAR	DOR	4.6 km	MPC · JPL
84688	2002 VO_{102}	—	November 12, 2002	Socorro	LINEAR	·	3.5 km	MPC · JPL
84689	2002 VY_{102}	—	November 12, 2002	Socorro	LINEAR	V	1.3 km	MPC · JPL
84690	2002 VJ_{105}	—	November 12, 2002	Socorro	LINEAR	·	1.3 km	MPC · JPL
84691	2002 VT_{105}	—	November 12, 2002	Socorro	LINEAR	·	3.7 km	MPC · JPL
84692	2002 VT_{107}	—	November 12, 2002	Socorro	LINEAR	·	7.2 km	MPC · JPL
84693	2002 VY_{107}	—	November 12, 2002	Socorro	LINEAR	·	4.7 km	MPC · JPL
84694	2002 VR_{108}	—	November 12, 2002	Socorro	LINEAR	(5)	1.6 km	MPC · JPL
84695	2002 VH_{109}	—	November 12, 2002	Socorro	LINEAR	·	2.9 km	MPC · JPL
84696	2002 VQ_{109}	—	November 12, 2002	Socorro	LINEAR	·	4.1 km	MPC · JPL
84697	2002 VL_{110}	—	November 12, 2002	Socorro	LINEAR	·	1.9 km	MPC · JPL
84698	2002 VN_{110}	—	November 12, 2002	Socorro	LINEAR	·	10 km	MPC · JPL
84699	2002 VU_{110}	—	November 12, 2002	Socorro	LINEAR	·	2.9 km	MPC · JPL
84700	2002 VL_{112}	—	November 13, 2002	Palomar	NEAT	EUN	2.6 km	MPC · JPL

== 84701–84800 ==
back to top

Designation			Discovery			Properties		Ref
Permanent	Provisional	Named after	Date	Site	Discoverer(s)	Category	Diam.	Ref
84701	2002 VX_{112}	—	November 13, 2002	Palomar	NEAT	·	2.5 km	MPC · JPL
84702	2002 VQ_{113}	—	November 13, 2002	Palomar	NEAT	HOF	5.3 km	MPC · JPL
84703	2002 VX_{113}	—	November 13, 2002	Palomar	NEAT	·	4.7 km	MPC · JPL
84704	2002 VN_{115}	—	November 11, 2002	Anderson Mesa	LONEOS	·	4.7 km	MPC · JPL
84705	2002 VK_{117}	—	November 13, 2002	Palomar	NEAT	·	4.8 km	MPC · JPL
84706	2002 VF_{119}	—	November 12, 2002	Socorro	LINEAR	·	2.6 km	MPC · JPL
84707	2002 VJ_{119}	—	November 12, 2002	Socorro	LINEAR	·	5.4 km	MPC · JPL
84708	2002 VU_{119}	—	November 12, 2002	Socorro	LINEAR	·	4.6 km	MPC · JPL
84709	2002 VW_{120}	—	November 12, 2002	Palomar	NEAT	L5	20 km	MPC · JPL
84710	2002 VE_{121}	—	November 12, 2002	Palomar	NEAT	·	4.6 km	MPC · JPL
84711	2002 VH_{121}	—	November 12, 2002	Palomar	NEAT	·	2.6 km	MPC · JPL
84712	2002 VY_{121}	—	November 13, 2002	Palomar	NEAT	·	3.5 km	MPC · JPL
84713	2002 VM_{122}	—	November 13, 2002	Palomar	NEAT	·	1.8 km	MPC · JPL
84714	2002 VE_{123}	—	November 13, 2002	Palomar	NEAT	·	2.4 km	MPC · JPL
84715	2002 VT_{124}	—	November 12, 2002	Socorro	LINEAR	·	1.6 km	MPC · JPL
84716	2002 VK_{127}	—	November 12, 2002	Socorro	LINEAR	·	7.0 km	MPC · JPL
84717	2002 VD_{128}	—	November 13, 2002	Kingsnake	J. V. McClusky	EUN	3.5 km	MPC · JPL
84718	2002 VQ_{128}	—	November 14, 2002	Socorro	LINEAR	·	5.1 km	MPC · JPL
84719	2002 VR_{128}	—	November 3, 2002	Palomar	C. A. Trujillo, M. E. Brown	plutino	448 km	MPC · JPL
84720	2002 WT_{2}	—	November 23, 2002	Palomar	NEAT	·	5.9 km	MPC · JPL
84721	2002 WU_{2}	—	November 23, 2002	Palomar	NEAT	·	3.2 km	MPC · JPL
84722	2002 WV_{2}	—	November 23, 2002	Kingsnake	J. V. McClusky	HNS	3.6 km	MPC · JPL
84723	2002 WO_{3}	—	November 24, 2002	Palomar	NEAT	EUN	3.2 km	MPC · JPL
84724	2002 WS_{3}	—	November 24, 2002	Palomar	NEAT	·	3.3 km	MPC · JPL
84725	2002 WB_{4}	—	November 24, 2002	Palomar	NEAT	·	2.2 km	MPC · JPL
84726	2002 WJ_{6}	—	November 24, 2002	Palomar	NEAT	EOS	4.4 km	MPC · JPL
84727	2002 WL_{6}	—	November 24, 2002	Palomar	NEAT	·	4.3 km	MPC · JPL
84728	2002 WZ_{7}	—	November 24, 2002	Palomar	NEAT	·	3.6 km	MPC · JPL
84729	2002 WP_{8}	—	November 24, 2002	Palomar	NEAT	·	1.8 km	MPC · JPL
84730	2002 WB_{10}	—	November 24, 2002	Palomar	NEAT	·	2.7 km	MPC · JPL
84731	2002 WP_{10}	—	November 24, 2002	Palomar	NEAT	(5)	2.9 km	MPC · JPL
84732	2002 WT_{10}	—	November 25, 2002	Palomar	NEAT	·	2.6 km	MPC · JPL
84733	2002 WS_{11}	—	November 27, 2002	Anderson Mesa	LONEOS	MAR	2.3 km	MPC · JPL
84734	2002 WX_{11}	—	November 27, 2002	Anderson Mesa	LONEOS	EUN	2.6 km	MPC · JPL
84735	2002 WO_{12}	—	November 27, 2002	Anderson Mesa	LONEOS	slow	2.5 km	MPC · JPL
84736	2002 WS_{12}	—	November 27, 2002	Anderson Mesa	LONEOS	·	7.8 km	MPC · JPL
84737	2002 WZ_{12}	—	November 28, 2002	Anderson Mesa	LONEOS	H	1.4 km	MPC · JPL
84738	2002 WG_{13}	—	November 30, 2002	Socorro	LINEAR	·	3.9 km	MPC · JPL
84739	2002 WS_{15}	—	November 28, 2002	Anderson Mesa	LONEOS	·	3.1 km	MPC · JPL
84740	2002 WW_{15}	—	November 28, 2002	Anderson Mesa	LONEOS	·	3.7 km	MPC · JPL
84741	2002 WW_{16}	—	November 28, 2002	Haleakala	NEAT	·	3.1 km	MPC · JPL
84742	2002 WF_{17}	—	November 28, 2002	Haleakala	NEAT	V	1.3 km	MPC · JPL
84743	2002 XY_{1}	—	December 1, 2002	Socorro	LINEAR	HYG	4.7 km	MPC · JPL
84744	2002 XX_{2}	—	December 1, 2002	Socorro	LINEAR	TIR	7.1 km	MPC · JPL
84745	2002 XL_{4}	—	December 3, 2002	Palomar	NEAT	MAR	4.0 km	MPC · JPL
84746	2002 XR_{6}	—	December 1, 2002	Haleakala	NEAT	·	1.3 km	MPC · JPL
84747	2002 XX_{7}	—	December 2, 2002	Socorro	LINEAR	·	8.4 km	MPC · JPL
84748	2002 XQ_{9}	—	December 2, 2002	Socorro	LINEAR	·	1.9 km	MPC · JPL
84749	2002 XA_{10}	—	December 2, 2002	Socorro	LINEAR	·	4.5 km	MPC · JPL
84750	2002 XN_{10}	—	December 3, 2002	Palomar	NEAT	·	2.9 km	MPC · JPL
84751	2002 XM_{11}	—	December 3, 2002	Palomar	NEAT	·	2.6 km	MPC · JPL
84752	2002 XT_{11}	—	December 3, 2002	Palomar	NEAT	·	3.4 km	MPC · JPL
84753	2002 XA_{16}	—	December 3, 2002	Palomar	NEAT	·	2.9 km	MPC · JPL
84754	2002 XP_{18}	—	December 5, 2002	Socorro	LINEAR	·	2.9 km	MPC · JPL
84755	2002 XZ_{18}	—	December 5, 2002	Socorro	LINEAR	·	5.6 km	MPC · JPL
84756	2002 XM_{19}	—	December 2, 2002	Socorro	LINEAR	·	2.0 km	MPC · JPL
84757	2002 XN_{20}	—	December 2, 2002	Socorro	LINEAR	·	2.6 km	MPC · JPL
84758	2002 XT_{20}	—	December 2, 2002	Socorro	LINEAR	·	1.9 km	MPC · JPL
84759	2002 XR_{22}	—	December 3, 2002	Palomar	NEAT	ADE	5.5 km	MPC · JPL
84760	2002 XS_{22}	—	December 3, 2002	Mauna Kea	Mauna Kea	·	3.7 km	MPC · JPL
84761	2002 XJ_{24}	—	December 5, 2002	Socorro	LINEAR	·	2.3 km	MPC · JPL
84762	2002 XL_{26}	—	December 3, 2002	Palomar	NEAT	MAR	1.9 km	MPC · JPL
84763	2002 XS_{26}	—	December 3, 2002	Palomar	NEAT	·	3.7 km	MPC · JPL
84764	2002 XC_{30}	—	December 5, 2002	Haleakala	NEAT	EUN	3.1 km	MPC · JPL
84765	2002 XE_{32}	—	December 6, 2002	Socorro	LINEAR	HYG	3.7 km	MPC · JPL
84766	2002 XM_{32}	—	December 6, 2002	Socorro	LINEAR	·	2.7 km	MPC · JPL
84767	2002 XL_{33}	—	December 7, 2002	Socorro	LINEAR	EUN	2.5 km	MPC · JPL
84768	2002 XA_{36}	—	December 5, 2002	Socorro	LINEAR	MRX	2.3 km	MPC · JPL
84769	2002 XW_{36}	—	December 6, 2002	Socorro	LINEAR	·	3.4 km	MPC · JPL
84770	2002 XX_{36}	—	December 6, 2002	Socorro	LINEAR	·	3.5 km	MPC · JPL
84771	2002 XQ_{38}	—	December 7, 2002	Socorro	LINEAR	·	3.8 km	MPC · JPL
84772	2002 XG_{42}	—	December 6, 2002	Socorro	LINEAR	·	5.1 km	MPC · JPL
84773	2002 XN_{42}	—	December 6, 2002	Socorro	LINEAR	URS	8.8 km	MPC · JPL
84774	2002 XU_{51}	—	December 10, 2002	Socorro	LINEAR	·	3.3 km	MPC · JPL
84775	2002 XW_{51}	—	December 10, 2002	Socorro	LINEAR	·	3.8 km	MPC · JPL
84776	2002 XP_{56}	—	December 10, 2002	Socorro	LINEAR	EUN	3.4 km	MPC · JPL
84777	2002 XY_{56}	—	December 10, 2002	Socorro	LINEAR	V	1.5 km	MPC · JPL
84778	2002 XP_{59}	—	December 10, 2002	Tebbutt	F. B. Zoltowski	·	3.3 km	MPC · JPL
84779	2002 XQ_{59}	—	December 10, 2002	Socorro	LINEAR	·	4.1 km	MPC · JPL
84780	2002 XN_{60}	—	December 10, 2002	Socorro	LINEAR	·	2.7 km	MPC · JPL
84781	2002 XA_{71}	—	December 10, 2002	Socorro	LINEAR	·	4.7 km	MPC · JPL
84782	2002 XE_{73}	—	December 11, 2002	Socorro	LINEAR	·	2.9 km	MPC · JPL
84783	2002 XF_{74}	—	December 11, 2002	Socorro	LINEAR	·	2.3 km	MPC · JPL
84784	2002 XH_{74}	—	December 11, 2002	Socorro	LINEAR	·	4.9 km	MPC · JPL
84785	2002 XZ_{74}	—	December 11, 2002	Socorro	LINEAR	V	1.6 km	MPC · JPL
84786	2002 XF_{77}	—	December 11, 2002	Socorro	LINEAR	·	2.3 km	MPC · JPL
84787	2002 XZ_{78}	—	December 11, 2002	Socorro	LINEAR	·	8.7 km	MPC · JPL
84788	2002 XH_{79}	—	December 11, 2002	Socorro	LINEAR	HYG	6.2 km	MPC · JPL
84789	2002 XF_{83}	—	December 13, 2002	Socorro	LINEAR	·	2.8 km	MPC · JPL
84790	2002 XS_{83}	—	December 13, 2002	Palomar	NEAT	BRA	3.4 km	MPC · JPL
84791	2002 XP_{86}	—	December 11, 2002	Socorro	LINEAR	·	3.9 km	MPC · JPL
84792	2002 XX_{86}	—	December 11, 2002	Socorro	LINEAR	·	2.1 km	MPC · JPL
84793	2002 XZ_{86}	—	December 11, 2002	Socorro	LINEAR	·	1.6 km	MPC · JPL
84794	2002 XY_{87}	—	December 12, 2002	Socorro	LINEAR	EUN	3.2 km	MPC · JPL
84795	2002 XO_{89}	—	December 9, 2002	Bergisch Gladbach	W. Bickel	·	5.4 km	MPC · JPL
84796	2002 XZ_{89}	—	December 14, 2002	Socorro	LINEAR	·	4.1 km	MPC · JPL
84797	2002 XL_{90}	—	December 15, 2002	Haleakala	NEAT	·	4.8 km	MPC · JPL
84798	2002 XJ_{92}	—	December 4, 2002	Kitt Peak	M. W. Buie	PHO	2.3 km	MPC · JPL
84799	2002 XX_{100}	—	December 5, 2002	Socorro	LINEAR	·	1.8 km	MPC · JPL
84800	2002 XP_{101}	—	December 5, 2002	Socorro	LINEAR	·	4.9 km	MPC · JPL

== 84801–84900 ==
back to top

Designation			Discovery			Properties		Ref
Permanent	Provisional	Named after	Date	Site	Discoverer(s)	Category	Diam.	Ref
84801	2002 XR_{103}	—	December 5, 2002	Socorro	LINEAR	·	4.6 km	MPC · JPL
84802	2002 YC_{1}	—	December 27, 2002	Anderson Mesa	LONEOS	·	2.6 km	MPC · JPL
84803	2002 YB_{6}	—	December 28, 2002	Kitt Peak	Spacewatch	·	5.7 km	MPC · JPL
84804	2002 YJ_{8}	—	December 31, 2002	Socorro	LINEAR	·	3.0 km	MPC · JPL
84805	2002 YS_{8}	—	December 31, 2002	Socorro	LINEAR	·	4.3 km	MPC · JPL
84806	2002 YF_{12}	—	December 31, 2002	Socorro	LINEAR	·	5.7 km	MPC · JPL
84807	2002 YK_{12}	—	December 31, 2002	Anderson Mesa	LONEOS	THM	7.3 km	MPC · JPL
84808	2002 YZ_{15}	—	December 31, 2002	Socorro	LINEAR	EOS	3.5 km	MPC · JPL
84809	2002 YE_{16}	—	December 31, 2002	Socorro	LINEAR	·	2.5 km	MPC · JPL
84810	2002 YV_{16}	—	December 31, 2002	Socorro	LINEAR	(3460)	4.7 km	MPC · JPL
84811	2002 YW_{16}	—	December 31, 2002	Socorro	LINEAR	AGN	2.5 km	MPC · JPL
84812	2002 YL_{17}	—	December 31, 2002	Socorro	LINEAR	KOR	2.9 km	MPC · JPL
84813	2002 YO_{17}	—	December 31, 2002	Socorro	LINEAR	AST	4.3 km	MPC · JPL
84814	2002 YU_{17}	—	December 31, 2002	Socorro	LINEAR	·	2.1 km	MPC · JPL
84815	2002 YQ_{18}	—	December 31, 2002	Socorro	LINEAR	·	1.5 km	MPC · JPL
84816	2002 YS_{18}	—	December 31, 2002	Socorro	LINEAR	·	4.0 km	MPC · JPL
84817	2002 YN_{19}	—	December 31, 2002	Socorro	LINEAR	·	3.1 km	MPC · JPL
84818	2002 YA_{20}	—	December 31, 2002	Socorro	LINEAR	·	2.3 km	MPC · JPL
84819	2002 YC_{21}	—	December 31, 2002	Socorro	LINEAR	THM	5.1 km	MPC · JPL
84820	2002 YO_{21}	—	December 31, 2002	Socorro	LINEAR	(11882)	3.0 km	MPC · JPL
84821	2002 YR_{21}	—	December 31, 2002	Socorro	LINEAR	·	3.0 km	MPC · JPL
84822	2002 YW_{21}	—	December 31, 2002	Socorro	LINEAR	V	2.0 km	MPC · JPL
84823	2002 YA_{22}	—	December 31, 2002	Socorro	LINEAR	·	6.9 km	MPC · JPL
84824	2002 YK_{24}	—	December 31, 2002	Socorro	LINEAR	·	2.2 km	MPC · JPL
84825	2002 YE_{26}	—	December 31, 2002	Socorro	LINEAR	·	2.3 km	MPC · JPL
84826	2002 YU_{34}	—	December 31, 2002	Socorro	LINEAR	·	2.5 km	MPC · JPL
84827	2003 AC	—	January 1, 2003	Socorro	LINEAR	·	7.0 km	MPC · JPL
84828	2003 AL	—	January 1, 2003	Socorro	LINEAR	·	4.7 km	MPC · JPL
84829	2003 AN	—	January 1, 2003	Socorro	LINEAR	TIR	5.7 km	MPC · JPL
84830	2003 AP_{4}	—	January 1, 2003	Kingsnake	J. V. McClusky	EUN	2.3 km	MPC · JPL
84831	2003 AB_{5}	—	January 1, 2003	Socorro	LINEAR	EOS	4.2 km	MPC · JPL
84832	2003 AD_{8}	—	January 3, 2003	Socorro	LINEAR	·	5.5 km	MPC · JPL
84833	2003 AF_{9}	—	January 4, 2003	Socorro	LINEAR	·	5.1 km	MPC · JPL
84834	2003 AZ_{9}	—	January 1, 2003	Socorro	LINEAR	GEF	2.6 km	MPC · JPL
84835	2003 AA_{10}	—	January 1, 2003	Socorro	LINEAR	·	9.9 km	MPC · JPL
84836	2003 AF_{10}	—	January 1, 2003	Socorro	LINEAR	EOS	4.2 km	MPC · JPL
84837	2003 AT_{10}	—	January 1, 2003	Socorro	LINEAR	·	5.7 km	MPC · JPL
84838	2003 AU_{10}	—	January 1, 2003	Socorro	LINEAR	·	5.0 km	MPC · JPL
84839	2003 AG_{12}	—	January 1, 2003	Socorro	LINEAR	·	4.1 km	MPC · JPL
84840	2003 AT_{12}	—	January 1, 2003	Socorro	LINEAR	V	1.9 km	MPC · JPL
84841	2003 AL_{14}	—	January 2, 2003	Socorro	LINEAR	·	5.2 km	MPC · JPL
84842	2003 AS_{17}	—	January 5, 2003	Anderson Mesa	LONEOS	·	6.3 km	MPC · JPL
84843	2003 AO_{20}	—	January 5, 2003	Socorro	LINEAR	·	7.6 km	MPC · JPL
84844	2003 AL_{22}	—	January 5, 2003	Socorro	LINEAR	GEF	2.6 km	MPC · JPL
84845	2003 AV_{22}	—	January 7, 2003	Socorro	LINEAR	·	4.7 km	MPC · JPL
84846	2003 AN_{23}	—	January 4, 2003	Socorro	LINEAR	·	3.8 km	MPC · JPL
84847	2003 AW_{28}	—	January 4, 2003	Socorro	LINEAR	·	5.4 km	MPC · JPL
84848	2003 AP_{31}	—	January 5, 2003	Socorro	LINEAR	V	1.8 km	MPC · JPL
84849	2003 AP_{34}	—	January 7, 2003	Socorro	LINEAR	·	4.2 km	MPC · JPL
84850	2003 AR_{35}	—	January 7, 2003	Socorro	LINEAR	·	2.0 km	MPC · JPL
84851	2003 AE_{36}	—	January 7, 2003	Socorro	LINEAR	PHO	3.3 km	MPC · JPL
84852	2003 AN_{38}	—	January 7, 2003	Socorro	LINEAR	EMA	7.6 km	MPC · JPL
84853	2003 AE_{39}	—	January 7, 2003	Socorro	LINEAR	·	9.2 km	MPC · JPL
84854	2003 AX_{44}	—	January 5, 2003	Socorro	LINEAR	NYS	2.7 km	MPC · JPL
84855	2003 AR_{45}	—	January 5, 2003	Socorro	LINEAR	·	3.5 km	MPC · JPL
84856	2003 AY_{47}	—	January 5, 2003	Socorro	LINEAR	·	11 km	MPC · JPL
84857	2003 AH_{49}	—	January 5, 2003	Socorro	LINEAR	·	7.5 km	MPC · JPL
84858	2003 AC_{52}	—	January 5, 2003	Socorro	LINEAR	·	4.3 km	MPC · JPL
84859	2003 AY_{64}	—	January 7, 2003	Socorro	LINEAR	·	2.2 km	MPC · JPL
84860	2003 AJ_{65}	—	January 7, 2003	Socorro	LINEAR	·	4.7 km	MPC · JPL
84861	2003 AG_{72}	—	January 11, 2003	Socorro	LINEAR	·	4.9 km	MPC · JPL
84862	2003 AU_{73}	—	January 10, 2003	Socorro	LINEAR	·	2.1 km	MPC · JPL
84863	2003 AF_{76}	—	January 10, 2003	Socorro	LINEAR	·	8.9 km	MPC · JPL
84864	2003 AM_{84}	—	January 11, 2003	Goodricke-Pigott	R. A. Tucker	·	2.9 km	MPC · JPL
84865	2003 BM_{7}	—	January 26, 2003	Anderson Mesa	LONEOS	·	3.5 km	MPC · JPL
84866	2003 BR_{8}	—	January 26, 2003	Anderson Mesa	LONEOS	·	7.9 km	MPC · JPL
84867	2003 BX_{13}	—	January 26, 2003	Palomar	NEAT	·	6.4 km	MPC · JPL
84868	2003 BX_{17}	—	January 27, 2003	Socorro	LINEAR	·	3.6 km	MPC · JPL
84869	2003 BD_{22}	—	January 25, 2003	Palomar	NEAT	·	6.6 km	MPC · JPL
84870	2003 BB_{24}	—	January 25, 2003	Palomar	NEAT	·	7.2 km	MPC · JPL
84871	2003 BV_{28}	—	January 27, 2003	Anderson Mesa	LONEOS	·	2.2 km	MPC · JPL
84872	2003 BM_{36}	—	January 27, 2003	Socorro	LINEAR	·	5.6 km	MPC · JPL
84873	2003 BW_{55}	—	January 28, 2003	Socorro	LINEAR	CYB	9.3 km	MPC · JPL
84874	2003 BO_{64}	—	January 29, 2003	Palomar	NEAT	·	7.0 km	MPC · JPL
84875	2003 BW_{68}	—	January 28, 2003	Haleakala	NEAT	·	7.4 km	MPC · JPL
84876	2003 BN_{71}	—	January 28, 2003	Socorro	LINEAR	·	10 km	MPC · JPL
84877	2003 BT_{79}	—	January 31, 2003	Socorro	LINEAR	ERI	5.7 km	MPC · JPL
84878	2003 BV_{88}	—	January 28, 2003	Socorro	LINEAR	EUN	2.6 km	MPC · JPL
84879	2003 BX_{88}	—	January 28, 2003	Socorro	LINEAR	fast	4.1 km	MPC · JPL
84880	2003 CF_{6}	—	February 1, 2003	Socorro	LINEAR	EUN	2.9 km	MPC · JPL
84881	2003 CF_{11}	—	February 4, 2003	Palomar	NEAT	LUT	7.2 km	MPC · JPL
84882 Table Mountain	2003 CN_{16}	Table Mountain	February 1, 2003	Wrightwood	J. W. Young	·	3.0 km	MPC · JPL
84883	2003 DC_{22}	—	February 28, 2003	Socorro	LINEAR	·	4.8 km	MPC · JPL
84884 Dorismcmillan	2003 FS_{20}	Dorismcmillan	March 23, 2003	Catalina	CSS	·	7.8 km	MPC · JPL
84885	2003 FT_{32}	—	March 23, 2003	Kitt Peak	Spacewatch	·	2.1 km	MPC · JPL
84886	2003 FE_{102}	—	March 31, 2003	Anderson Mesa	LONEOS	·	3.3 km	MPC · JPL
84887	2003 HL_{7}	—	April 24, 2003	Anderson Mesa	LONEOS	KOR	2.4 km	MPC · JPL
84888	2003 MA_{9}	—	June 28, 2003	Socorro	LINEAR	EOS	3.6 km	MPC · JPL
84889	2003 NQ_{8}	—	July 2, 2003	Socorro	LINEAR	·	5.4 km	MPC · JPL
84890	2003 NP_{9}	—	July 2, 2003	Anderson Mesa	LONEOS	H	4.2 km	MPC · JPL
84891	2003 OH_{14}	—	July 21, 2003	Palomar	NEAT	·	2.4 km	MPC · JPL
84892	2003 QD_{79}	—	August 24, 2003	Socorro	LINEAR	THB	9.0 km	MPC · JPL
84893	2003 SM_{98}	—	September 19, 2003	Kitt Peak	Spacewatch	·	4.3 km	MPC · JPL
84894	2003 SJ_{182}	—	September 20, 2003	Socorro	LINEAR	·	7.2 km	MPC · JPL
84895	2003 SD_{252}	—	September 26, 2003	Socorro	LINEAR	·	5.7 km	MPC · JPL
84896	2003 SM_{252}	—	September 26, 2003	Socorro	LINEAR	·	4.3 km	MPC · JPL
84897	2003 SV_{296}	—	September 29, 2003	Anderson Mesa	LONEOS	·	4.5 km	MPC · JPL
84898	2003 SW_{296}	—	September 29, 2003	Anderson Mesa	LONEOS	EUP	9.9 km	MPC · JPL
84899	2003 SQ_{299}	—	September 29, 2003	Socorro	LINEAR	·	4.0 km	MPC · JPL
84900	2003 SH_{306}	—	September 30, 2003	Socorro	LINEAR	ADE	7.1 km	MPC · JPL

== 84901–85000 ==
back to top

Designation			Discovery			Properties		Ref
Permanent	Provisional	Named after	Date	Site	Discoverer(s)	Category	Diam.	Ref
84901	2003 TF_{13}	—	October 15, 2003	Socorro	LINEAR	·	4.0 km	MPC · JPL
84902 Porrentruy	2003 UU_{11}	Porrentruy	October 17, 2003	Vicques	M. Ory	THM	8.1 km	MPC · JPL
84903	2003 UM_{38}	—	October 17, 2003	Kitt Peak	Spacewatch	·	5.0 km	MPC · JPL
84904	2003 UD_{57}	—	October 24, 2003	Socorro	LINEAR	EOS	4.2 km	MPC · JPL
84905	2003 UD_{98}	—	October 19, 2003	Anderson Mesa	LONEOS	CYB	9.0 km	MPC · JPL
84906	2003 UU_{132}	—	October 19, 2003	Palomar	NEAT	·	6.3 km	MPC · JPL
84907	2003 UQ_{138}	—	October 21, 2003	Socorro	LINEAR	·	5.4 km	MPC · JPL
84908	2003 UR_{138}	—	October 21, 2003	Anderson Mesa	LONEOS	·	6.4 km	MPC · JPL
84909	2003 US_{138}	—	October 21, 2003	Anderson Mesa	LONEOS	·	3.4 km	MPC · JPL
84910	2003 UG_{190}	—	October 22, 2003	Socorro	LINEAR	(1547)	3.9 km	MPC · JPL
84911	2003 UH_{190}	—	October 22, 2003	Anderson Mesa	LONEOS	AEG	7.1 km	MPC · JPL
84912	2003 UP_{222}	—	October 22, 2003	Socorro	LINEAR	·	9.8 km	MPC · JPL
84913	2003 UG_{226}	—	October 22, 2003	Socorro	LINEAR	·	7.1 km	MPC · JPL
84914	2003 UP_{235}	—	October 24, 2003	Kitt Peak	Spacewatch	·	4.8 km	MPC · JPL
84915	2003 UT_{247}	—	October 24, 2003	Kitt Peak	Spacewatch	·	8.3 km	MPC · JPL
84916	2003 UO_{251}	—	October 25, 2003	Kitt Peak	Spacewatch	GEF	3.1 km	MPC · JPL
84917	2003 UX_{259}	—	October 25, 2003	Socorro	LINEAR	·	1.7 km	MPC · JPL
84918	2003 UQ_{260}	—	October 25, 2003	Socorro	LINEAR	EUN	3.7 km	MPC · JPL
84919 Karinthy	2003 VH	Karinthy	November 3, 2003	Piszkéstető	K. Sárneczky, Mészáros, S.	·	5.7 km	MPC · JPL
84920	2003 VM_{1}	—	November 6, 2003	Ondřejov	Manek, J.	EUN	2.9 km	MPC · JPL
84921 Morkoláb	2003 VN_{1}	Morkoláb	November 9, 2003	Piszkéstető	K. Sárneczky, B. Sipőcz	·	3.9 km	MPC · JPL
84922	2003 VS_{2}	—	November 14, 2003	Palomar	NEAT	plutino	524 km	MPC · JPL
84923	2003 VZ_{3}	—	November 14, 2003	Palomar	NEAT	·	3.1 km	MPC · JPL
84924	2003 VB_{6}	—	November 15, 2003	Goodricke-Pigott	R. A. Tucker	EUN ·	3.2 km	MPC · JPL
84925	2003 VL_{9}	—	November 15, 2003	Palomar	NEAT	·	3.4 km	MPC · JPL
84926 Marywalker	2003 WR_{3}	Marywalker	November 16, 2003	Catalina	CSS	·	3.8 km	MPC · JPL
84927	2003 WT_{9}	—	November 18, 2003	Kitt Peak	Spacewatch	·	6.6 km	MPC · JPL
84928 Oliversacks	2003 WE_{13}	Oliversacks	November 16, 2003	Catalina	CSS	KOR	2.6 km	MPC · JPL
84929	2003 WJ_{19}	—	November 19, 2003	Socorro	LINEAR	EOS	4.3 km	MPC · JPL
84930	2003 WX_{21}	—	November 21, 2003	Palomar	NEAT	·	11 km	MPC · JPL
84931	2003 WG_{73}	—	November 20, 2003	Socorro	LINEAR	·	8.3 km	MPC · JPL
84932	2003 WE_{77}	—	November 19, 2003	Socorro	LINEAR	·	4.1 km	MPC · JPL
84933	2003 WM_{77}	—	November 19, 2003	Socorro	LINEAR	EUN	3.6 km	MPC · JPL
84934	2003 WH_{83}	—	November 20, 2003	Socorro	LINEAR	·	4.9 km	MPC · JPL
84935	2003 WT_{87}	—	November 22, 2003	Socorro	LINEAR	NYS	2.2 km	MPC · JPL
84936	2003 WJ_{121}	—	November 20, 2003	Socorro	LINEAR	GEF	2.2 km	MPC · JPL
84937	2003 WX_{123}	—	November 20, 2003	Socorro	LINEAR	·	1.3 km	MPC · JPL
84938	2003 WQ_{127}	—	November 20, 2003	Socorro	LINEAR	·	4.7 km	MPC · JPL
84939	2003 WO_{130}	—	November 21, 2003	Socorro	LINEAR	·	3.3 km	MPC · JPL
84940	2003 WL_{138}	—	November 21, 2003	Socorro	LINEAR	·	4.4 km	MPC · JPL
84941	2003 WE_{142}	—	November 21, 2003	Socorro	LINEAR	DOR	5.4 km	MPC · JPL
84942	2003 WJ_{142}	—	November 21, 2003	Socorro	LINEAR	·	1.8 km	MPC · JPL
84943 Timothylinn	2003 WC_{148}	Timothylinn	November 23, 2003	Catalina	CSS	PHO	4.3 km	MPC · JPL
84944	2003 WL_{153}	—	November 26, 2003	Anderson Mesa	LONEOS	·	6.5 km	MPC · JPL
84945 Solosky	2003 WP_{153}	Solosky	November 27, 2003	Catalina	CSS	·	3.6 km	MPC · JPL
84946	2003 WS_{161}	—	November 30, 2003	Socorro	LINEAR	·	11 km	MPC · JPL
84947	2003 WX_{169}	—	November 19, 2003	Socorro	LINEAR	·	3.7 km	MPC · JPL
84948	2003 WN_{170}	—	November 20, 2003	Socorro	LINEAR	·	4.7 km	MPC · JPL
84949	2003 WE_{171}	—	November 21, 2003	Anderson Mesa	LONEOS	EUN	4.0 km	MPC · JPL
84950	2003 XJ_{3}	—	December 1, 2003	Socorro	LINEAR	·	6.9 km	MPC · JPL
84951 Kenwilson	2003 XX_{4}	Kenwilson	December 1, 2003	Catalina	CSS	·	4.0 km	MPC · JPL
84952	2003 XD_{5}	—	December 1, 2003	Socorro	LINEAR	·	3.3 km	MPC · JPL
84953	2003 XE_{5}	—	December 1, 2003	Socorro	LINEAR	EUN ·	6.1 km	MPC · JPL
84954	2003 XY_{7}	—	December 3, 2003	Socorro	LINEAR	·	8.0 km	MPC · JPL
84955	2003 XB_{9}	—	December 4, 2003	Socorro	LINEAR	·	4.2 km	MPC · JPL
84956	2003 XL_{11}	—	December 12, 2003	Palomar	NEAT	·	3.5 km	MPC · JPL
84957	2003 XN_{13}	—	December 14, 2003	Palomar	NEAT	·	4.7 km	MPC · JPL
84958	2003 XS_{13}	—	December 14, 2003	Palomar	NEAT	·	3.7 km	MPC · JPL
84959	2003 XF_{18}	—	December 14, 2003	Kitt Peak	Spacewatch	ADE	7.8 km	MPC · JPL
84960	2003 XS_{21}	—	December 14, 2003	Kitt Peak	Spacewatch	·	2.3 km	MPC · JPL
84961	2003 XU_{21}	—	December 15, 2003	Palomar	NEAT	·	3.7 km	MPC · JPL
84962	2003 YM_{9}	—	December 17, 2003	Črni Vrh	Mikuž, H.	·	11 km	MPC · JPL
84963	2003 YN_{13}	—	December 17, 2003	Anderson Mesa	LONEOS	·	4.0 km	MPC · JPL
84964	2003 YF_{14}	—	December 17, 2003	Socorro	LINEAR	·	4.0 km	MPC · JPL
84965	2003 YV_{16}	—	December 17, 2003	Palomar	NEAT	·	6.3 km	MPC · JPL
84966	2003 YW_{16}	—	December 17, 2003	Palomar	NEAT	TIR	7.9 km	MPC · JPL
84967	2003 YX_{16}	—	December 17, 2003	Palomar	NEAT	·	4.7 km	MPC · JPL
84968	2003 YW_{17}	—	December 16, 2003	Anderson Mesa	LONEOS	·	1.9 km	MPC · JPL
84969	2003 YB_{18}	—	December 16, 2003	Anderson Mesa	LONEOS	·	6.3 km	MPC · JPL
84970	2003 YA_{23}	—	December 16, 2003	Anderson Mesa	LONEOS	V	1.5 km	MPC · JPL
84971	2003 YZ_{23}	—	December 17, 2003	Socorro	LINEAR	·	4.3 km	MPC · JPL
84972	2003 YM_{28}	—	December 17, 2003	Palomar	NEAT	EUP	8.1 km	MPC · JPL
84973	2003 YO_{28}	—	December 17, 2003	Kitt Peak	Spacewatch	THM	6.0 km	MPC · JPL
84974	2003 YB_{39}	—	December 19, 2003	Socorro	LINEAR	·	2.1 km	MPC · JPL
84975	2003 YG_{43}	—	December 19, 2003	Socorro	LINEAR	·	1.7 km	MPC · JPL
84976	2003 YM_{43}	—	December 19, 2003	Socorro	LINEAR	HYG	7.1 km	MPC · JPL
84977	2003 YN_{53}	—	December 19, 2003	Socorro	LINEAR	KOR	3.5 km	MPC · JPL
84978	2003 YY_{53}	—	December 19, 2003	Socorro	LINEAR	·	3.4 km	MPC · JPL
84979	2003 YU_{64}	—	December 19, 2003	Socorro	LINEAR	·	1.5 km	MPC · JPL
84980	2003 YZ_{64}	—	December 19, 2003	Socorro	LINEAR	·	7.0 km	MPC · JPL
84981	2003 YB_{65}	—	December 19, 2003	Socorro	LINEAR	·	6.7 km	MPC · JPL
84982	2003 YM_{65}	—	December 19, 2003	Socorro	LINEAR	·	3.9 km	MPC · JPL
84983	2003 YO_{65}	—	December 19, 2003	Socorro	LINEAR	·	2.1 km	MPC · JPL
84984	2003 YL_{66}	—	December 20, 2003	Socorro	LINEAR	V	1.5 km	MPC · JPL
84985	2003 YU_{66}	—	December 20, 2003	Socorro	LINEAR	·	6.4 km	MPC · JPL
84986	2003 YC_{83}	—	December 18, 2003	Kitt Peak	Spacewatch	·	3.8 km	MPC · JPL
84987	2003 YK_{83}	—	December 18, 2003	Črni Vrh	Mikuž, H.	·	4.0 km	MPC · JPL
84988	2003 YY_{88}	—	December 19, 2003	Socorro	LINEAR	·	7.7 km	MPC · JPL
84989	2003 YD_{89}	—	December 19, 2003	Socorro	LINEAR	V	1.3 km	MPC · JPL
84990	2003 YC_{90}	—	December 19, 2003	Kitt Peak	Spacewatch	·	2.8 km	MPC · JPL
84991 Bettyphilpotts	2003 YM_{94}	Bettyphilpotts	December 22, 2003	Catalina	CSS	·	3.8 km	MPC · JPL
84992	2003 YM_{100}	—	December 19, 2003	Socorro	LINEAR	EOS	4.2 km	MPC · JPL
84993	2003 YL_{102}	—	December 19, 2003	Socorro	LINEAR	·	2.7 km	MPC · JPL
84994 Amysimon	2003 YW_{106}	Amysimon	December 22, 2003	Catalina	CSS	·	5.3 km	MPC · JPL
84995 Zselic	2003 YB_{108}	Zselic	December 26, 2003	Piszkéstető	K. Sárneczky	EOS	4.1 km	MPC · JPL
84996 Hortobágy	2003 YW_{110}	Hortobágy	December 26, 2003	Piszkéstető	K. Sárneczky	·	3.6 km	MPC · JPL
84997	2003 YP_{118}	—	December 27, 2003	Kitt Peak	Spacewatch	·	4.3 km	MPC · JPL
84998	2003 YD_{123}	—	December 27, 2003	Socorro	LINEAR	·	3.6 km	MPC · JPL
84999	2003 YM_{123}	—	December 27, 2003	Haleakala	NEAT	·	4.9 km	MPC · JPL
85000	2003 YA_{125}	—	December 27, 2003	Črni Vrh	Matičič, S.	·	4.0 km	MPC · JPL

back to top

== See also ==
- Meanings of minor-planet names: 84001–85000
