= Watchung Conference =

Defunct high school athletics league in New Jersey

The Watchung Conference was a high school sports association under the jurisdiction of the New Jersey State Interscholastic Athletic Association (NJSIAA). The conference consisted of eleven public high schools covering Essex County, Hudson County and Union County in northern New Jersey. In 2009, the conference was disbanded. The Essex County schools joined the Super Essex Conference, the Union County schools joined the Union County Interscholastic Athletic Association, and the Hudson County schools joined the temporary North Jersey Tri-County Conference, before joining their Hudson County schools in reviving the Hudson County Interscholastic Athletic Association in 2010.

== Sports ==
- Fall Sports: Cross Country, Field Hockey, Football, Girls' Tennis, Soccer, Volleyball
- Winter Sports: Basketball, Hockey, Swimming, Track & Field, Wrestling
- Spring Sports: Baseball, Boys' Tennis, Golf, Lacrosse, Softball, Track & Field, Volleyball

== Member schools ==
School	Location	School District	Team Name
Cranford High school	Cranford	Cranford Township Public Schools	Cougars
East Side High School	Newark	Newark Public Schools	Red Raiders
Elizabeth High School	Elizabeth	Elizabeth Public Schools	Minutemen
Irvington High School	Irvington	Irvington Public Schools	Knights
Kearny High School	Kearny	Kearny School District	Kardinals
Linden High School	Linden	Linden Public Schools	Tigers
Plainfield High School	Plainfield	Plainfield Public School District	Cardinals
Scotch Plains-Fanwood High School	Scotch Plains	Scotch Plains-Fanwood Regional School District	Raiders
Malcolm X Shabazz High School	Newark	Newark Public Schools	Bulldogs
Union High School	Union Township	Union Public School District	Farmers
Westfield High School	Westfield	Westfield Public Schools	Blue Devils
