= Darnell Stapleton =

American football player and coach (born 1985)

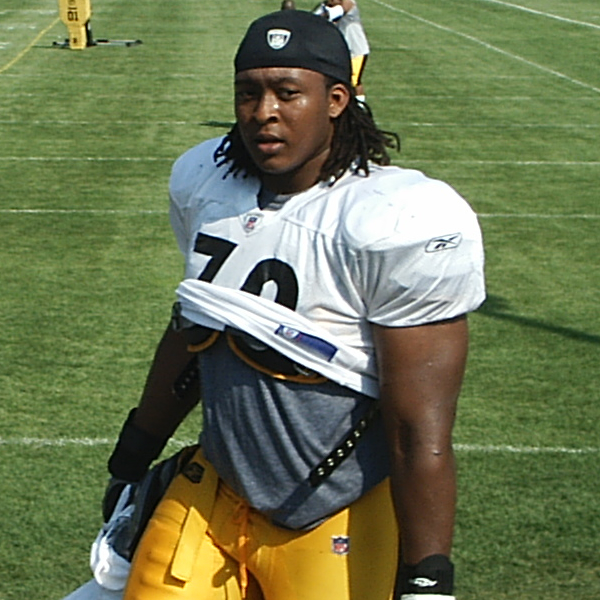
- Stapleton with the Pittsburgh Steelers in 2007

Washington Commanders
- Title: Offensive line coach

Personal information
- Born: September 21, 1985 (age 41); Union Township, New Jersey, U.S.
- Listed height: 6 ft 3 in (1.91 m)
- Listed weight: 305 lb (138 kg)

Career information
- Position: Guard (No. 72)
- High school: Union
- College: Hudson Valley (2003–2004); Rutgers (2005–2006)
- NFL draft: 2007: undrafted

Career history

Playing
- Pittsburgh Steelers (2007–2009); Florida Tuskers (2010); New England Patriots (2010)*
- * Offseason or practice squad member only

Coaching
- New York Sharks (2011) Head coach; Montclair Kimberley Academy (2012) Offensive line coach; Rutgers Scarlet Knights (2013) Graduate assistant; Bucknell Bison (2014–2017) Offensive line coach; Sam Houston State Bearkats (2018–2020) Offensive line coach; Louisiana Ragin' Cajuns (2021) Assistant offensive line coach; Florida Gators (2022–2023) Offensive line coach; Washington Commanders (2024–present); Assistant offensive line coach (2024–2025); Offensive line coach (2026–present)

Awards and highlights
- Super Bowl champion (XLIII)
- Stats at Pro Football Reference

Darnell Robert Stapleton (born September 21, 1985) is an American professional football coach and former guard who is the offensive line coach for the Washington Commanders of the National Football League (NFL). He played college football for the Rutgers Scarlet Knights and won Super Bowl XLIII with the Pittsburgh Steelers, whom he signed with as an undrafted free agent in 2007.

== Early life ==
Stapleton played football for Union High School. As a senior in 2002, he was a first-team All-Watchung Conference selection, and a first-team all-county selection.

== College career ==
=== Junior college ===
Stapleton attended Hudson Valley Community College for two seasons. In 2003, he earned second-team all-league honors. He started 11 games in 2004, and was a first-team All-Northeast Football Conference selection and a preseason NJCAA Honorable Mention All-American.

=== Rutgers University ===
Following junior college, Stapleton enrolled at Rutgers University, where he became the team's starting center in spring camps in 2005. He started 12 games on the season. In his senior year, Stapleton started 13 games and was a finalist for the Rimington Trophy, given to the nation's best center. The Rutgers offensive line allowed only eight sacks on the season, the fewest in the nation, while Rutgers running back Ray Rice set a Big East Conference record with 1,794 yards on the season. Stapleton was awarded the David Bender Trophy, given to the team's best player on the offensive line.

== Professional career ==
=== Pittsburgh Steelers ===
Stapleton was signed as an undrafted free agent by the Pittsburgh Steelers following the 2007 NFL draft. He made the Steelers' 53-man roster in his rookie season but was inactive for every regular season and playoff game. In 2008, Stapleton was a reserve for the first four games of the season, before starting the final 12 games at right guard in place of an injured Kendall Simmons. He also started the team's three playoff games, including the Super Bowl XLIII victory over the Arizona Cardinals. He did not play in the team's first three preseason games in 2009 before being placed on injured reserve on August 31, 2009, with a knee injury. He was not offered a tender by the team as a restricted free agent following the season.

=== Florida Tuskers ===
Stapleton signed to play with the United Football League's Florida Tuskers in July 2010.

=== New England Patriots ===
Stapleton signed with the New England Patriots on August 9, 2010, but waived two days later.

== Coaching career ==
=== New York Sharks ===
As of 2011 Stapleton is the head coach for the New York Sharks, a professional women's football team in the Women's Football Alliance. The New York Sharks are the longest running and winningest team in women's football history with 3 conference titles (2002, 2003, 2004 IWFL East), 6 division titles (2002, 2003, 2004, 2005, 2006, 2007 IWFL) and 1 championship title (2002 IWFL).

=== Montclair Kimberley Cougars ===
Stapleton coached the offensive and defensive lines at Montclair Kimberly Academy for the 2012 season. The Cougars went 9–2, their best ever record.

=== Rutgers Scarlet Knights ===
After his brief stint as head coach of the New York Sharks, Darnell Stapleton returned to Rutgers for the position of offensive assistant in 2012.

=== Pace University Setters ===
Stapleton was supposed to be an offensive line coach for the 2014 Setters season, however on July 16, 2014, he announced that he would be joining the Bucknell University Bison for their 2014 season.

=== Washington Commanders ===
On February 15, 2024, Stapleton was hired by the Washington Commanders as their assistant offensive line coach under head coach Dan Quinn. Following the firing of Bobby Johnson, Stapleton was promoted to offensive line coach on January 19, 2026.
