= Sam T. Timer =

American football coach

Biographical details
- Born: December 22, 1926; Scranton, Pennsylvania, U.S.
- Died: February 10, 2010 (aged 83); Pinehurst, North Carolina, U.S.

Coaching career (HC unless noted)
- ?–1957: North Plainfield HS (NJ)
- 1958–1960: Virginia (DB)
- 1963: Wake Forest (assistant)
- 1965: Cornell (assistant)
- 1966–1969: Duke (assistant)
- 1970–1983: Allegheny
- 1984–1987: Boston College (QB)

Head coaching record
- Overall: 60–52–3 (college)

Accomplishments and honors

Championships
- 2 PAC (1974, 1976)

Sam Thomas Timer (December 22, 1926 – February 10, 2010) was an American football coach. He served as the head football coach at Allegheny College in Meadville, Pennsylvania, for 14 seasons, from 1970 to 1983, compiling a record of 60–52–3 (.535).

== Biography ==
Raised in Union Township, Union County, New Jersey, Timer attended Union High School and Panzer College (later merged into what is now Montclair State University). He died on February 10, 2010, at his home in Pinehurst, North Carolina.

== Head coaching record ==
=== College ===
Year	Team	Overall	Conference	Standing	Bowl/playoffs
Allegheny Gators (Presidents' Athletic Conference) (1970–1985)
1970	Allegheny	2–5	2–3	4th	
1971	Allegheny	4–4	2–3	T–4th	
1972	Allegheny	5–4	5–2	T–2nd	
1973	Allegheny	5–3–1	5–1–1	2nd	
1974	Allegheny	7–1	6–1	T–1st	
1975	Allegheny	6–2	NA (Note: Allegheny was ineligible to compete for the Presidents' Athletic Conference title in 1975.)	NA	
1976	Allegheny	6–2	6–1	1st	
1977	Allegheny	5–3	5–2	T–2nd	
1978	Allegheny	4–3–1	3–3–1	T–5th	
1979	Allegheny	3–5	3–4	T–4th	
1980	Allegheny	3–4–1	3–3–1	5th	
1981	Allegheny	3–5	3–4	T–5th	
1982	Allegheny	3–6	3–4	T–5th	
1983	Allegheny	4–5	2–5	7th	
Allegheny:		60–52–3	48–36–3		
Total:		60–52–3			
National championship Conference title Conference division title or championship game berth
