= Caldwell Parsonage =

Historic house in New Jersey, United States

- U.S. National Register of Historic Places
- New Jersey Register of Historic Places
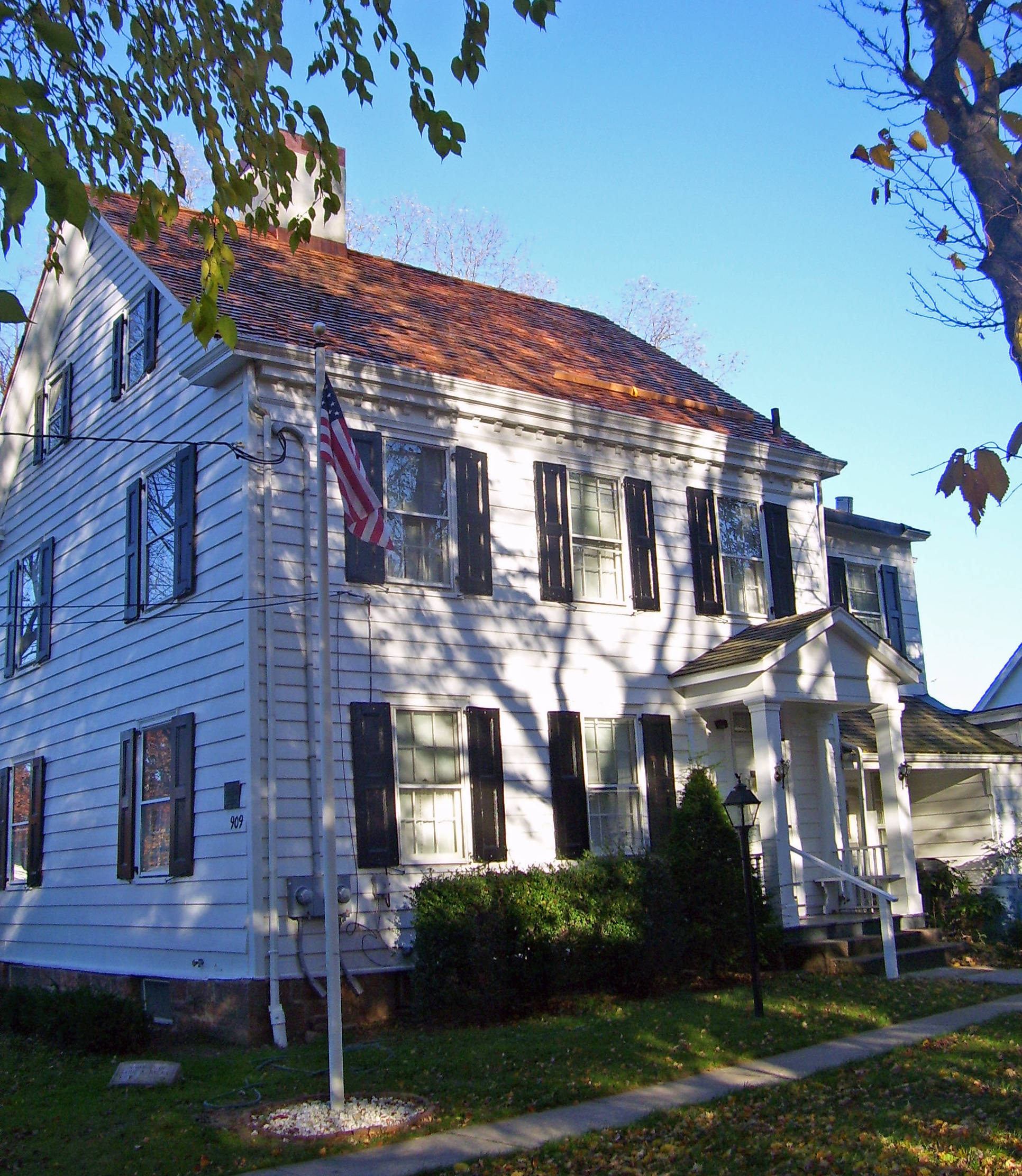
- House in 2007

- Location within Union County, New Jersey Location within New Jersey Location within the United States
- Location: 909 Caldwell Avenue, Union, New Jersey
- Coordinates: 40°41′43″N 74°17′00″W
- Built: 1782
- NRHP reference No.: 82004785
- NJRHP No.: 2656

Significant dates
- Added to NRHP: 1982
- Designated NJRHP: June 25, 2007

The Caldwell Parsonage is located at 909 Caldwell Avenue in Union Township of Union County, New Jersey, United States. It was the home of the Rev. James Caldwell, a Presbyterian minister and active supporter of the Patriot cause during the American Revolutionary War. In 1982 it was added to the National Register of Historic Places, as a well-preserved 18th-century farmhouse with a historical connection.

The war is intertwined with the early history of the building. An original parsonage dating to 1730 was burned in 1780 by a Loyalist mob, and later that year Caldwell's wife Hannah was killed by British soldiers in the house during the Battle of Connecticut Farms. Caldwell himself was shot by an American sentry a year later.

In 1782, with the war over, what is now Connecticut Farms Presbyterian Church built the present building. It continued to serve as a home for its pastors until the 20th century, when the church built one closer to the building.

It currently serves as a historical museum, owned and operated by the Union Township Historical Society. It is open to the public on weekday mornings and afternoons. Several state grants have been made for renovations and upkeep of the aging structure.

== See also ==
- National Register of Historic Places listings in Union County, New Jersey
