= Brian Belott =

American artist and performer (b. 1973)

- Born: 1973 (age 51–52); East Orange, New Jersey, US
- Education: The Cooper Union; The School of Visual Arts

Brian Belott (born 1973 in East Orange, New Jersey) is an artist, performer and found object art collector based in New York City.

Belott attended Oratory Preparatory School and was recognized for his art as a student there. He received his BFA from The School of Visual Arts in New York in 1995 after one year attending Cooper Union, before being thrown out.

Brian Belott's work has been exhibited at Canada Gallery, the Zürcher Studio, the Museum of Modern Art in New York, Performa 17, and Galerie Zürcher in Paris, France in 2009.

Brian Belott's first book, Wipe That Clock Off Your Face (2007, PictureBox) includes a selection of his practices, including comic drawings, painting, collage, collage books, and a DVD with found sound and photography.

In November 2018, Gavin Brown's Enterprise opened a solo exhibition featuring some of Belott's never-before-exhibited frozen art works. The works, some of which included toothpaste, dog food and Play-doh, were exhibited throughout the gallery using industrial freezers.

One of 75 artists selected, Belott will participate in the 2019 Whitney Biennial at the Whitney Museum of American Art, New York, curated by Rujeko Hockley and Jane Panetta.
