= Cranford High School =

High school in Union County, New Jersey, US

Location
- 201 West End Place; Cranford, Union County, New Jersey 07016; United States; 40.661446°N 74.312258°W

Information
- Type: Public high school
- Motto: Praeclara video proboque (I see and acclaim excellence)
- Established: 1902
- School district: Cranford Township Public Schools
- NCES School ID: 340357005458
- Principal: Gina Donlevie
- Faculty: 101.0 FTEs
- Grades: 9-12
- Enrollment: 1,116 (as of 2024–25)
- Student to teacher ratio: 11.1:1
- Colors: Royal blue and gold
- Athletics conference: Union County Interscholastic Athletic Conference (general); Big Central Football Conference (football)
- Team name: Cougars
- Rival: Westfield High School
- Accreditation: Middle States Association of Colleges and Schools
- Newspaper: Spotlight News
- Yearbook: Golden C
- Website: chs.cranfordschools.org

Cranford High School is a four-year public high school serving students in ninth through twelfth grades, located in Cranford, in Union County, in the U.S. state of New Jersey, and operating as the lone secondary school of the Cranford Township Public Schools. The school has been accredited by the Middle States Association of Colleges and Schools Commission on Elementary and Secondary Schools since 1929.

As of the 2024–25 school year, the school had an enrollment of 1,116 students and 101.0 classroom teachers (on an FTE basis), for a student–teacher ratio of 11.1:1. There were 15 students (1.3% of enrollment) eligible for free lunch and 6 (0.5% of students) eligible for reduced-cost lunch.

== History ==
The school was initially founded in 1902 at Grant School and was relocated to Cleveland School in 1914. With Cleveland School operating more than 20% above capacity, plans were offered in 1932 to construct a standalone high school for $568,000, but the plans did not receive support from voters.

Construction of the current building began in 1937, with the school opening for grades 7–12 in January 1938. Grades seven and eight were moved out of the high school as part of a district realignment in 1958. The school was reduced further to a two-year high school with the openings of Hillside Avenue Junior High School and Orange Avenue Junior High School in September 1963. After several unsuccessful attempts during the 1960s to either construct a new high school or renovate the existing building, a bond referendum authorizing spending $6.2 million (equivalent to $51.4 million in 2025) to expand and renovate the school was finally approved in June 1970. The four-wing addition and renovations were completed in September 1973, allowing sophomores to return to the building. Freshmen returned to the building in September 1979 as part of a district realignment, meaning that the school would return to serving grades 9–12 for the first time in 17 years.

== Academics ==
CHS offers more than 25 Advanced Placement classes in addition to many honors and college-preparatory classes. The faculty contributes to the scholastic environment with over 40% of the staff with post-baccalaureate degrees.

The school developed "The High School University of Cranford," a program that provides additional opportunities for those who wish to extend their education without having to place in the top portion of the class based on class rank formulated from GPA calculation. It serves as the school's equivalent to a "gifted and talented" program. In 2009, the school was one of 170 honored nationwide by the Character Education Partnership, which recognized the school for its University Program.

=== Awards, recognition and rankings ===
The school was the 49th-ranked public high school in New Jersey out of 339 schools statewide in New Jersey Monthly magazine's September 2014 cover story on the state's "Top Public High Schools", using a new ranking methodology. The school had been ranked 51st in the state of 328 schools in 2012, after being ranked 13th in 2010 out of 322 schools listed (and second-highest in Union County). The magazine ranked the school 29th in its September 2008 issue, and 39th in its September 2006 issue.

In its listing of "America's Best High Schools 2016", the school was ranked 377th out of 500 best high schools in the country; it was ranked 43rd among all high schools in New Jersey and 26th among the state's non-magnet schools.

In its 2013 report on "America's Best High Schools", The Daily Beast ranked the school 206th in the nation among participating public high schools and 15th overall (eighth of non-magnet schools) in New Jersey.

In the 2011 "Ranking America's High Schools" issue by The Washington Post, the school was ranked 12th in New Jersey and 513th nationwide. In Newsweek's June 13, 2010 issue, ranking the country's top high schools, Cranford High School was listed in 551st place, the 11th-highest ranked school in New Jersey.

For the 2002–03 school year, Cranford High School was designated as a "Star School" by the New Jersey Department of Education, the highest honor that a New Jersey school can achieve.

In 2004, Cranford High School was recognized as a National School of Character Winner by the Character Education Partnership, one of ten schools selected nationwide for its efforts in instilling character education in its curriculum and students.

== Extracurricular activities ==
=== Clubs ===
Cranford's DECA delegation also comes home from their conference(s) with numerous awards as well. In 2019, forty-six students advanced during the regional competition to participate in the state competition.

The online school newspaper is called Dialogue.

The school's student-run magazine is called Prologue Literary & Art Magazine. Its 2024 edition earned the highest distinction in the Recognizing Excellence in Art and Literary Magazines (REALM) contest.

In 1956 (tied with Columbia High School), the school's chess team was the New Jersey high school team champion, winning the Father Casimir J. Finley Trophy.

=== Athletics ===
The Cranford High School Cougars compete in the Union County Interscholastic Athletic Conference, which is comprised of public and private high schools in Union County and was established following a reorganization of sports leagues in Northern New Jersey by the New Jersey State Interscholastic Athletic Association (NJSIAA). Prior to the NJSIAA's 2009 realignment, the school participated in the Mountain Valley Conference. With 942 students in grades 10–12, the school was classified by the NJSIAA for the 2019–20 school year as Group III for most athletic competition purposes, which included schools with an enrollment of 761 to 1,058 students in that grade range. The football team competes in Division 4 of the Big Central Football Conference, which includes 60 public and private high schools in Hunterdon, Middlesex, Somerset, Union and Warren counties, which are broken down into 10 divisions by size and location. The school was classified by the NJSIAA as Group III North for football for 2024–2026, which included schools with 700 to 884 students.

From the conference's inception until the 2005–06 school year, Cranford had been a member of the Watchung Conference. Due to the change in size of the student body and location, Cranford's decision to leave the Watchung Conference for the Mountain Valley Conference was approved in 2006 and Cranford began competition in most sports in the 2006–07 school year, remaining there until the realignment.

The boys' track team won the spring / outdoor track state championship in Group III in 1932, won the Group II title in 1934–1936, 1946 and 1953.

The boys' basketball team won the Group II state championship in 1936 (defeating runner-up Merchantville High School in the tournament final) and won the Group III title in 2002 (vs. Penns Grove High School). Down by six points at the half, the 1936 team rallied to win the Group II state title with a 36–33 win against Merchantville in the championship game played at Rutgers University.

Cranford's football team was undefeated in 1957, won the North II Group III state championship, and was ranked eighth in the state behind seven Group IV schools. The Blue-and-Gold eleven shared the sectional title with the former Clifford Scott High School of East Orange in 1952. In the playoff era, the team won the North II Group III state sectional championship in 2011 and 2015. Cranford won the North II Group III state sectional championship in 2011 defeating Parsippany Hills High School by a score of 27–0, finishing the season with a 10–1 record, its only loss coming to Summit High School. The 2015 team won the program's second North II Group III playoff title with a 50–23 win against Chatham High School in the tournament final, finishing the season with 12–0 record. Since 2005, Cranford High School football has been led by coach Erik Rosenmeier, who played in the NFL for the Buffalo Bills.

Cranford High School's baseball won the Group IV state championship in 1971 (defeating Ewing High School in the tournament final), and has won Group III in 1997 (vs. Sayreville War Memorial High School), 2010 (vs. Ocean City High School), 2012 (vs. Freehold Borough High School) and 2013 (vs. Burlington Township High School); the five state championships places the program tied for 10th-most in the state. The team won the Union County Championship in 1999, 2000, 2001, 2003, 2007, 2010, 2011, 2013, 2015, and 2019; the team ranks second with a total of nine county tournament championships. The baseball team won the 2003 North II, Group III sectional championship, edging Millburn High School in the tournament final. The 2007 team won the North II, Group III state sectional championship, edging West Morris Central High School, by a score of 5–4. The 2010 baseball team was the first team to win all five championships possible: Conference, County, Section, North NJ, and State, including a 15–3 win over Ocean City High School for the program's third win in a Group III final, as part of a season in which the team finished with a record of 26–5. In 2012, the team outscored Freehold High School by a score of 4–1 in the Group III championship game. The 2013 team finished the season with a 25–1 record, winning the Group III title with a 4–2 win against Burlington Township High School.

The boys' cross country team won the Group IV state championship in 1975, the Group III title in 2000 and won in Group II in 2004.

The boys' bowling team won the overall state championship in 1982.

The field hockey team won the North II Group III state sectional championship in 1985 and 1986.

The boys' wrestling team won the North II Group III state sectional title in 1985, 1986 and 2017.

The ice hockey team won the Handchen Cup in 1996, the Union County Cup in 2016 and the Monsignor Kelly Cup in 2020. After losing in the final game of the tournament in the previous two seasons, The team won the Kelly Cup in 2020, defeating the Glen Ridge / Verona co-op team by a score of 3–2 in the tournament final.

The girls' soccer team was Group III co-champion in 2000 with Middletown High School South.

The girls' volleyball team won the Group II state championship in 2008, defeating Northern Valley Regional High School at Demarest in the final match of the playoff tournament. In the 2008 season, the team was equally successful and after losing the county tournament to Union Catholic at Union Catholic in a three games and also losing the Mountain Valley Conference to Union Catholic, the team came back to be seeded 1st in the Group II state championships and went on to capture the Group II state title over Northern Valley Regional High School at Demarest in the tournament final and advancing to the Tournament of Champions with a record of 24–4, becoming the first public school from Union County to capture a volleyball state title.

== In popular culture ==
The high school was featured on Nickelodeon's The Adventures of Pete & Pete.

== Administration ==
The school's principal is Gina Donlevie. Her core administration team includes two assistant principals.

== Notable people ==
=== Notable alumni ===
- Valentino Ambrosio (born 2000), American football placekicker who played for the Tulane Green Wave football team
- Carol Blazejowski (born 1956), general manager, New York Liberty; Member, Basketball Hall of Fame
- Robert Ferro (1941–1988), novelist who explored conflict of growing up gay in a loving but conservative Catholic family; he fondly recalled his CHS English teacher in a 1984 interview
- Will Fries (born 1998), offensive guard for the Minnesota Vikings of the National Football League
- Gordon Graceffo (born 2000, class of 2018), professional baseball pitcher for the St. Louis Cardinals
- Karl Kaimer (born 1938), former American football tight end who played one season with the New York Titans of the American Football League
- Gary Kott (born c. 1947, class of 1965), television and advertising writer, who was a writer and supervising producer of The Cosby Show
- Askold Melnyczuk (born 1954), writer who founded the journal AGNI and whose novels include What Is Told, Ambassador of the Dead, House of Widows and Excerpt from Smedley's Secret Guide to World Literature
- Nancy Salzman (born 1954), felon and the co-founder of NXIVM, a multi-level marketing company and cult
- Henry Simon (1921–2016), United States Air Force major general who served as deputy director of the Defense Supply Agency
- Bernie Wagenblast (born 1956), transportation journalist and voice-over artist
- Deborah Wolfe (1916–2004), educator, minister, and Education Chief of the United States House of Representatives Committee on Education and Labor

=== Notable faculty ===
- Hubie Brown (born 1933), NBA basketball coach and analyst
- Rollie Massimino (1934–2017), men's college basketball coach, most notably with the Villanova Wildcats
