= George Chapla =

American soccer player

Personal information
- Place of birth: England
- Position: Defender

Youth career
- 1968–1971: Montclair State University

Senior career*
| Years | Team | Apps | (Gls) |
| 1974 | Rhode Island Oceaneers | | |
| 1975 | Hartford Bicentennials | 5 | (0) |
- * Club domestic league appearances and goals

George Chapla is a retired American soccer defender who played one season each in the North American Soccer League and the American Soccer League.

Ethnically Ukrainian and raised in Union Township, Union County, New Jersey, Chapla graduated from Union High School in 1968. He attended Montclair State University, playing on the men's soccer team from 1968 to 1971. In 1974, Chapla turned professional with the Rhode Island Oceaneers. He spent the 1975 season with the Hartford Bicentennials of the North American Soccer League. On August 28, 1975, he scored a goal for the U.S. Olympic soccer team in a 4–2 loss to Mexico in a 1976 Summer Olympics qualification game. The U.S. team failed to qualify for the tournament there. He also played on the 1975 U.S. Pan American Games soccer team.

He coached the Union High School freshmen soccer team in the mid-2000s.
