= Union Watersphere =

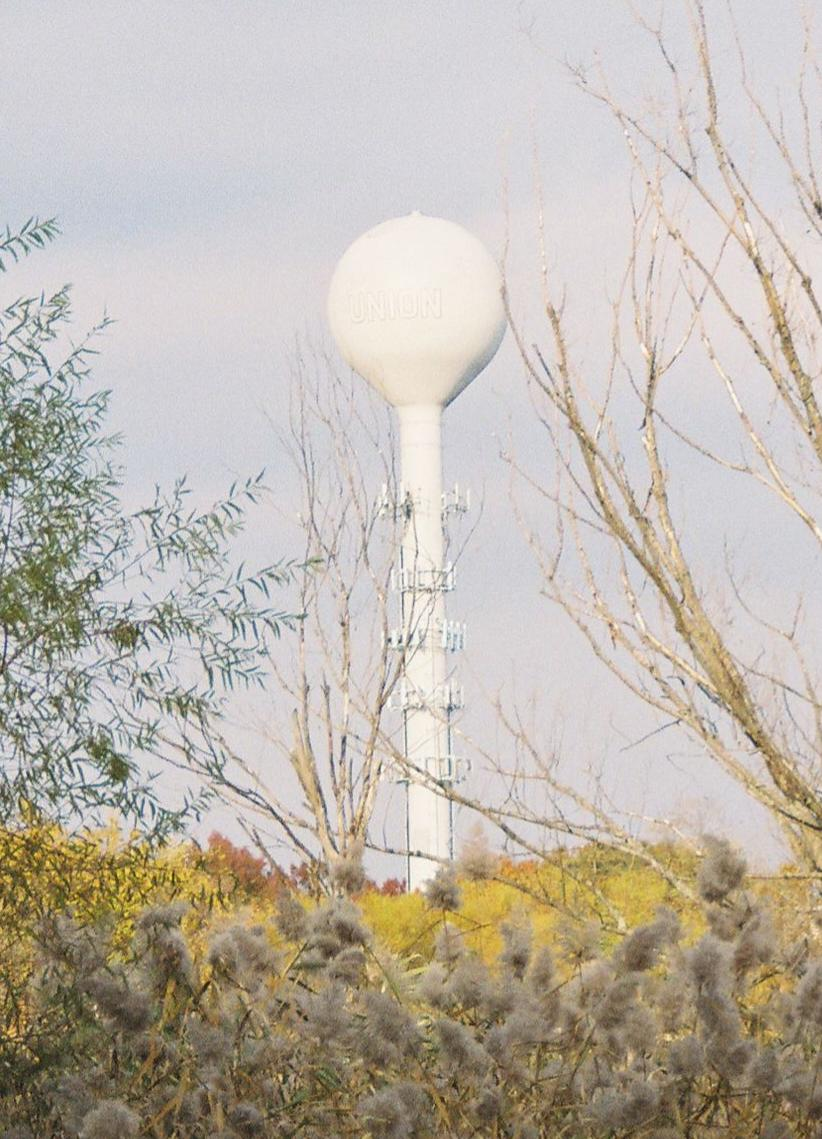
- At one time painted blue, the watersphere is a greyish white and emblazoned with UNION
- Interactive map of the Union Watersphere area
- Alternative names: Union Water Tower

General information
- Type: Water tower
- Location: Union, New Jersey, United States
- Coordinates: 40.693274°N 74.262046°W
- Construction started: 1964
- Cost: $89,500

Height
- Height: 212 ft (65 m)

Website
- http://www.worldstallestwatersphere.com/

The Union Watersphere, also known as the Union Water Tower, is a water tower topped with a sphere-shaped water tank in Union, New Jersey, United States and characterized as the World's Tallest Water Sphere.

Adjacent to U.S. Route 22, New Jersey Route 82, and the Garden State Parkway, the iconic tower has been a landmark since its construction. The tower was originally commissioned the Elizabethtown Water Company and is now owned by American Water. Standing 212 ft (65 m) tall, it was originally built in 1964 by Chicago Bridge and Iron Company at the cost of $89,500 and holds 250,000 US gallons (950,000 L) of well water. Due to its proximity to an airport, at the request of the Federal Aviation Administration, a red stroboscopic beacon was constructed atop the tower in 2008, adding 6 ft (1.8 m) of height. The pedestal is used as a telecommunications tower.

The tower is painted a grey-white. In the past it has been painted blue with the name of the town in large letters across the sphere. Its location at a major intersection of some of the state's busiest roads, and proximity to Newark Liberty International Airport, affords millions of people each year a view of the structure. A museum dedicated to the watersphere is located in Austin, Texas and is operated by a former Union resident. Another famous sphere, sometimes called the world's largest light bulb, is located nearby at the Edison Memorial Tower.

== Related and similar structures ==
A February 2012 Star Ledger article suggested a water tower in Erwin, North Carolina completed in early 2012, 219.75 ft (66.98 m) tall and holding 500,000 US gallons (1,900 m^{3}), had become the World's Tallest Water Sphere. However photographs of the Erwin water tower revealed the new tower to be a water spheroid.

The water tower in Braman, Oklahoma, built by the Kaw Nation and completed in 2010, is 220.6 ft (67.2 m) tall and can hold 350,000 US gallons (1,300 m^{3}). Slightly taller than the Union Watersphere, it is technically a spheroid. Another tower in Oklahoma, built in 1986 and billed as the largest water tower in the country, is 218 ft (66 m) tall, can hold 500,000 US gallons (1,900 m^{3}), and is located in Edmond.

The Earthoid, a nearly spherical tank located in Germantown, Maryland is 100 ft (30 m) tall and holds 2,000,000 US gallons (7,600 m^{3}) gallons of water. The name is taken from it being painted to resemble a globe of the world. The golf ball-shaped tank of the water tower at Gonzales, California is supported by three tubular legs and reaches about 125 ft (38 m) high. The Watertoren (or Water Towers) in Eindhoven, Netherlands contain three spherical tanks, each 10 m (33 ft) in diameter and capable of holding 500 cubic metres (130,000 US gal) of water, on three 43.45 m (142.6 ft) spires were completed in 1970.

== See also ==
- Weehawken Water Tower
- Mechelen-Zuid Water Tower
