= Roger Chanoine =

American football player (1976–2016)

No. 69
- Position: Offensive tackle

Personal information
- Born: September 11, 1976; Newark, New Jersey, U.S.
- Died: July 14, 2016 (aged 39); Cleveland, Ohio, U.S.
- Listed height: 6 ft 4 in (1.93 m)
- Listed weight: 305 lb (138 kg)

Career information
- High school: Linden (Linden, New Jersey)
- College: Temple
- NFL draft: 1998: undrafted

Career history
- St. Louis Rams (1998); Cleveland Browns (1999–2002); Jacksonville Jaguars (2002); Houston Texans (2003)*
- * Offseason or practice squad member only

Career NFL statistics
- Games played: 33
- Games started: 18
- Fumble recoveries: 1
- Stats at Pro Football Reference

Roger Chanoine Jr. (September 11, 1976 – July 14, 2016) was an American professional football player who was an offensive tackle in the National Football League (NFL) between 1998 and 2002, appearing primarily for the Cleveland Browns.

== Biography ==
Born in Newark, New Jersey, Chanoine was raised in Linden, New Jersey, and played prep football at Linden High School.

Chanoine played on the offensive line with the Temple University football team between 1994 and 1997. He went undrafted after college and he joined the St. Louis Rams as a free agent in 1998. He signed with the Cleveland Browns the next year. Of his 18 career games started, 16 of them came in the 2001 season, when he was the right tackle for the Browns. He split the 2002 season between the Browns and the Jacksonville Jaguars.

After his professional football days, Chanoine remained in the Cleveland area, and he was a sales manager with Konica Minolta. He died on July 14, 2016, of pancreatic cancer. He was survived by his wife and five children.
