= Connecticut Farms Presbyterian Church =

Historic church in New Jersey, United States

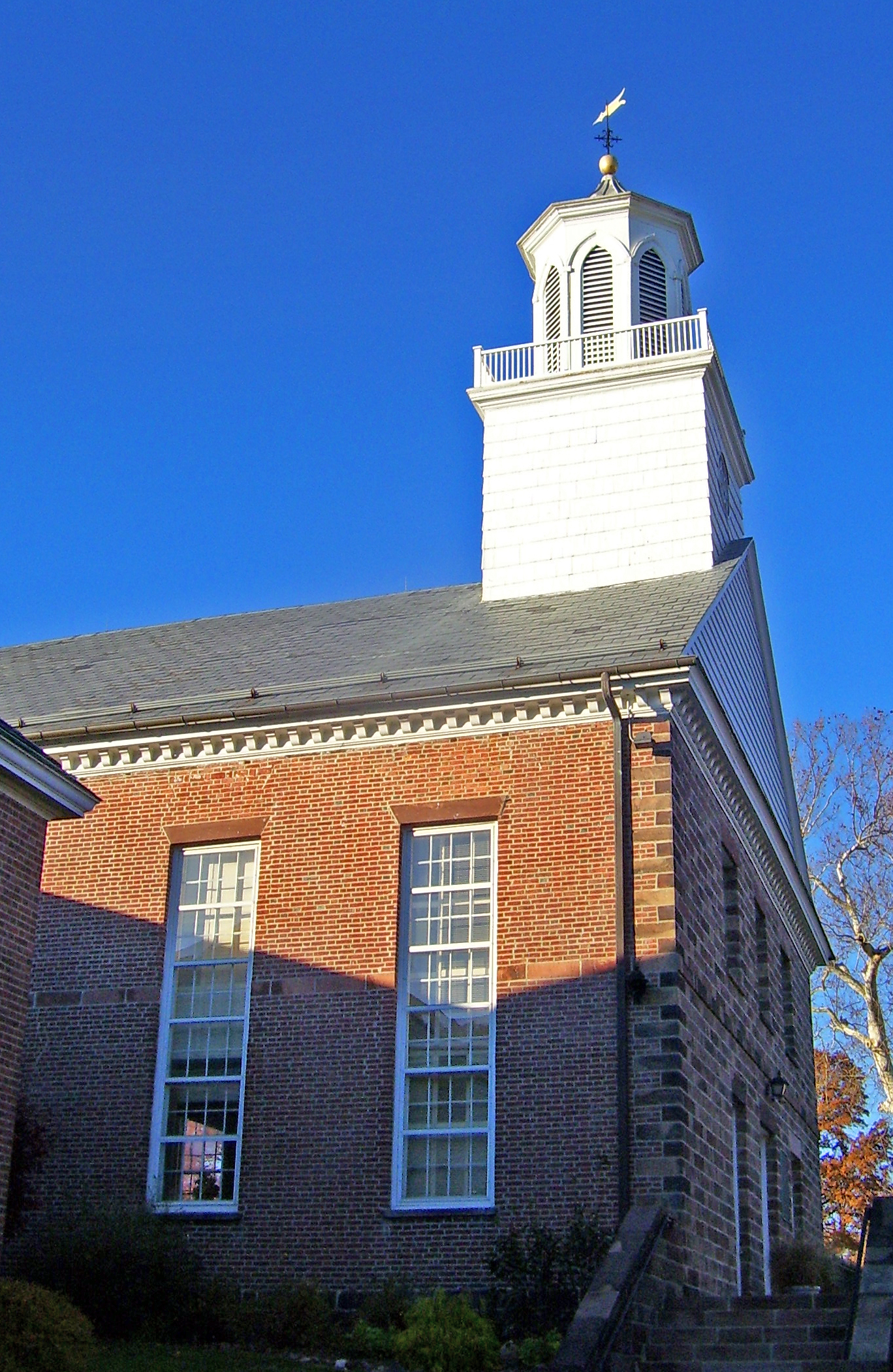
- Church in 2007

Religion
- Affiliation: Presbyterian
- Leadership: The Rev. Roberta (Bobbie) Arrowsmith, Minister
- Year consecrated: 1730; 296 years ago

Location
- Location: Union, NJ
- Interactive map of Connecticut Farms Presbyterian Church

Architecture
- Completed: 1782; 244 years ago

Specifications
- Direction of façade: east
- Materials: Brick

Website
- http://www.ctfarms.org
- First Presbyterian Congregation of Connecticut Farms
- U.S. National Register of Historic Places
- Location within Union County, New Jersey Location within New Jersey Location within the United States
- Location: Stuyvesant Avenue at Chestnut St., Union, New Jersey
- Coordinates: 40°41′36″N 74°16′26″W
- Area: 1.5 acres (0.61 ha)
- Built: 1782
- NRHP reference No.: 70000398
- Added to NRHP: April 3, 1970

Connecticut Farms Presbyterian Church is located at Stuyvesant and Chestnut avenues in Union, Union County, New Jersey, United States, near U.S. Route 22. It is the oldest church in the township.

Since the settlement of Connecticut Farms in 1667 by emigrants from that colony, residents had to travel 4–5 miles (6–9 km) over poor roads every Sunday to nearby Elizabethtown (today Elizabeth) to attend church. In 1730 they decided it was time to build their own place of worship and joined together to build a wood frame structure in the center of town on a small rise. Not long afterward, a parsonage was built nearby.

The original building lasted for half a century. In the latter years of the Revolutionary War, Loyalist troops under the command of Hessian general Wilhelm von Knyphausen burned the church along with the surrounding town and the parsonage during the Battle of Connecticut Farms, an unsuccessful British attempt to retake Morristown.

During the fighting, Hannah Caldwell, the wife of Continental Army chaplain James Caldwell, was shot dead at the parsonage. His wife stayed at home with their baby and a 3 year old toddler. As the British moved into Connecticut Farms, Hannah Caldwell was shot through a window or wall as she sat with her children on a bed. It has been named after the family ever since, and today serves as a local history museum.

After the war ended, the citizens of Connecticut Farms rebuilt their town and its church in 1782. The current brick building has stood ever since, supported at some times through the sale of grass and apples from the church's orchards In 1901 the parsonage was replaced with a new manse next to the church, which was itself expanded in 1920 and 1949 with wings consistent with its existing Colonial stylings.

This history earned the church a listing on the National Register of Historic Places in 1970. It was the first church in New Jersey to be listed.

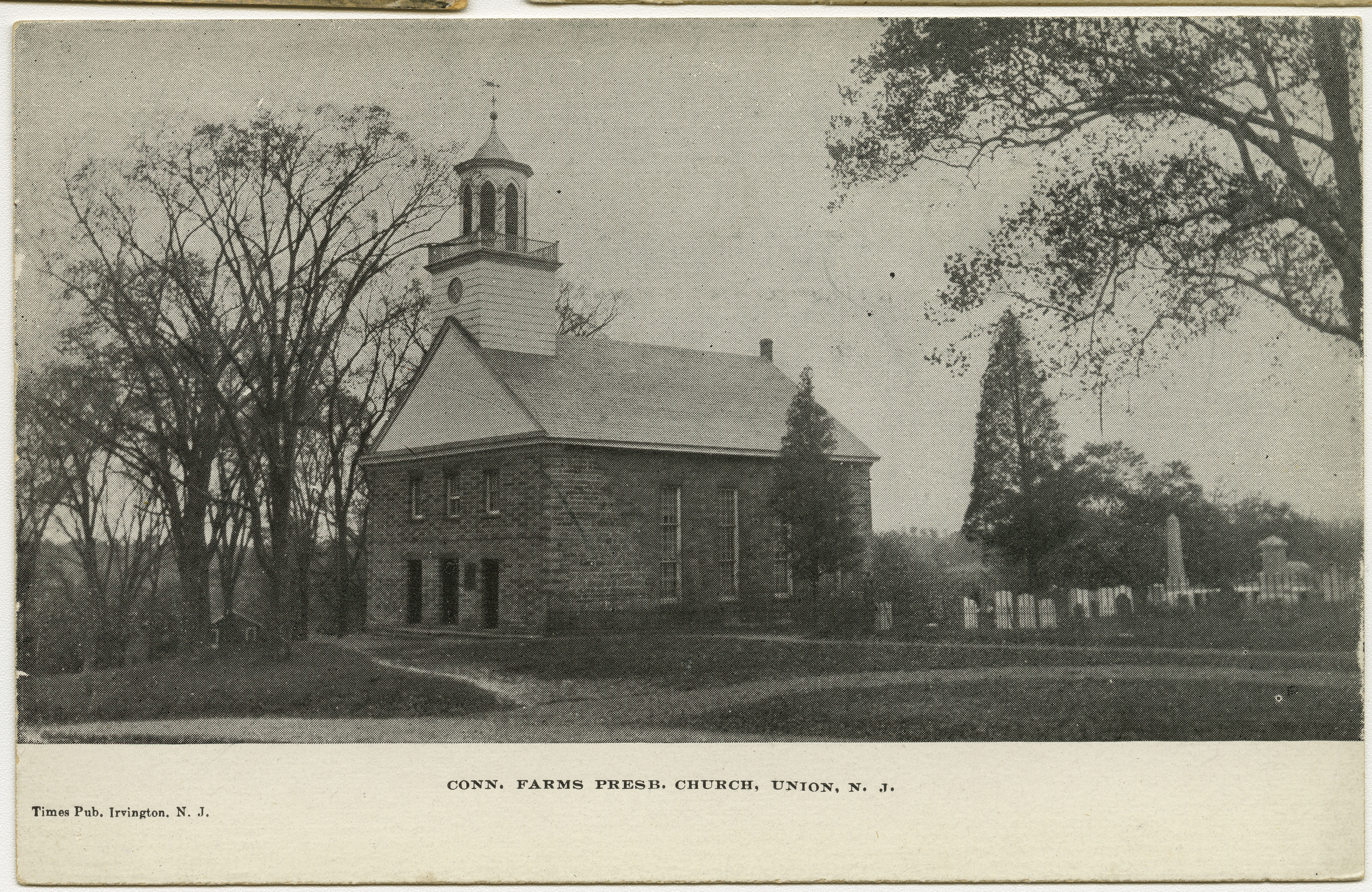
The church on a vintage postcard

== See also ==
- National Register of Historic Places listings in Union County, New Jersey
