= Union High School (New Jersey) =

High school in Union County, New Jersey, US

Location
- 2350 North Third Street; Union Township, Union County, New Jersey 07083; United States; 40.704229°N 74.283639°W

Information
- Type: Public high school
- School district: Union Public School District
- NCES School ID: 341650005742
- Principal: Althea Bossard
- Faculty: 157.0 FTEs
- Grades: 9-12
- Enrollment: 2,410 (as of 2024–25)
- Student to teacher ratio: 15.4:1
- Colors: Maroon white
- Athletics conference: Union County Interscholastic Athletic Conference (general); Big Central Football Conference (football)
- Team name: Farmers
- Rival: Linden High School
- Website: uhs.tups.org

Union High School is a comprehensive community public high school located in Union Township, in Union County, in the U.S. state of New Jersey, serving students in ninth through twelfth grades as the lone secondary school of the Union Public School District.

The school has been accredited by the Middle States Association of Colleges and Schools Commission on Elementary and Secondary Schools since 1953.

As of the 2024–25 school year, the school had an enrollment of 2,410 students and 157.0 classroom teachers (on an FTE basis), for a student–teacher ratio of 15.4:1. There were 1,012 students (42.0% of enrollment) eligible for free lunch and 223 (9.3% of students) eligible for reduced-cost lunch.

== History ==
High school education in Union dates to 1881 when six students enrolled in classes. Classes were originally held in the Connecticut Farms School, and from 1895 to 1906, in the Unionville School as well. Union's first high school building was constructed on Morris Avenue in 1924 with expansions in 1928, 1948, and 1959. In December 1965, voters approved a $4 million referendum to expand and convert Burnet Junior High School, which opened in 1958, into a senior high school, thereby relieving overcrowding in the 1924 building. An additional $850,000, caused by cost increases and a labor dispute, was approved by voters in May 1967. After two years of construction, Union High School moved to the former Burnet building in September 1969, with Burnet Junior High School moving to the former high school building.

== Awards, recognition and rankings ==
In 2024, Union High School was ranked 227th among high schools in New Jersey by U.S. News & World Report.

The school was the 201st-ranked public high school in New Jersey out of 339 schools statewide in New Jersey Monthly magazine's September 2014 cover story on the state's "Top Public High Schools", using a new ranking methodology. The school had been ranked 250th in the state of 328 schools in 2012, after being ranked 243rd in 2010 out of 322 schools listed. The magazine ranked the school 229th in 2008 out of 316 schools. The school was ranked 210th in the magazine's September 2006 issue, which surveyed 316 schools across the state.

== Union High School Performing Arts Company ==
The Union High School Performing Arts Company (UHSPAC) includes a theatre department, an instrumental music program, and various choral music groups.

=== Musicals ===
Union High School's theatre department, under the direction of James Mosser, produces two major theatrical productions annually and has been recognized numerous times by the Paper Mill Playhouse in their annual Rising Star Awards. In 2010, the UHSPAC's production of Joseph and the Amazing Technicolor Dreamcoat received the Rising Star Award for Best Overall Production, Best Director, Best Music Direction and Best Chorus; winning more awards than any other school in the state. UHSPAC's 2013 production of Cats was nominated for 14 Rising Star Awards and won five, the second-most of any school in the state, including awards for Outstanding Chorus, Outstanding Choreography/Musical Staging, and Outstanding Orchestra. Also in 2015, the UHSPAC production of "Sophisticated Ladies" was nominated for 16 Rising Star Awards, winning nine of them, the most in the 20-year history of the Rising Star Awards. Of those nine included: Outstanding Overall Production of a Musical, Outstanding Performance in a Featured Role, Outstanding Musical Direction. The UHSPAC came home with more awards than any other school in the state. In 2018 their production of Peter Pan won best musical at the Paper Mill Playhouse Rising star Awards, making their third best musical win.

=== Marching Band ===
The Union High School Marching Band consists of wind, percussion, and color guard members. The band performs at all school football games and competes in many USBands and Tournament of Bands (TOB) competitions located in the New York/New Jersey/Pennsylvania area. At the 2012 Yamaha Cup, with their show entitled, "Rosie", the marching band won 1st place in Group 4A competition and received the awards for Best Music, Best Visual, and Best Overall Effect. In 2014 with their show entitled, "Soaring", the marching band won 1st place in the USBANDS Group 3A New Jersey state championship at Rutgers University and received the award for Best Overall Effect. Also in 2014, the band won 1st place at the USBands Group 3A National Championships in Allentown, Pennsylvania. They took home the awards for Best Guard, Best Music, and Best Visual.

== Athletics ==
The Union High School Farmers compete in the Union County Conference, which is comprised of public and private high schools in Union County and was established following a reorganization of sports leagues in Northern New Jersey by the New Jersey State Interscholastic Athletic Association (NJSIAA). Prior to the NJSIAA's 2010 realignment, the school had participated in the Watchung Conference, a high school sports association which included public high schools in Essex, Hudson and Union counties. With 1,618 students in grades 10–12, the school was classified by the NJSIAA for the 2019–20 school year as Group IV for most athletic competition purposes, which included schools with an enrollment of 1,060 to 5,049 students in that grade range. The football team competes in Division 5A of the Big Central Football Conference, which includes 60 public and private high schools in Hunterdon, Middlesex, Somerset, Union and Warren counties, which are broken down into 10 divisions by size and location. The school was classified by the NJSIAA as Group V North for football for 2024–2026, which included schools with 1,317 to 5,409 students.

Together with David Brearley High School, the school participates in a cooperative ice hockey program with Jonathan Dayton High School as the host school / lead agency, under an agreement scheduled to expire at the end of the 2023–24 school year.

The boys spring / outdoor track team won the Group III state championship in 1930 and 1931, won the Group II title in 1933, and won in Group IV in 1973.

The boys' cross country team won the overall Public B title in 1931 and the overall state championship in 1943.

The boys tennis team won the overall state championship in 1959 (against runner-up Teaneck High School in the final match of the tournament) and 1960 (vs. Ridgewood High School). The 1959 team won the state title after defeating previously undefeated River Dell High School 3-0 in the quarterfinals and Ridgewood High School 2-1 in the semis before knocking off Teaneck 2-1 in the final round of the tournament.

The boys' bowling team won the overall state championship in 1966, 1968 and 1986. The program's three state titles are tied for seventh-most in the state.

The baseball team won the Group IV state championship in 1972 (vs. Ewing High School), 1974 (vs. Sayreville High School) and 2002 (vs. Jackson Memorial High School).

The boys track team won the winter track Meet of Champions in 1973.

The football team won the North II Group IV state sectional championships in 1978, 1979, 1982, 1984–1987 and 1991–1993, and won the North II Group V title in 2019. In the 1979 North II Group IV final, the team won the championship with a 35-24 victory against a Livingston High School team led by quarterback Stan Yagiello at Giants Stadium in front of 15,000 fans The 1991 team came back from a 14-0 at the half to defeat Randolph High School by a score of 24-14 in the North II Group IV championship game, to end Randolph's 59-game unbeaten streak, which was the longest at the time in state history. The 1992 team, ranked fifth in the nation by USA Today, finished the season with an 11-0 record and extended their winning streak to 22 games after taking the North Group IV state sectional title with a 21-7 victory against Randolph High School in the championship game played in front of 7,000 fans. In 1993, the team beat Randolph 19-6 to win the North II Group IV sectional championship and finish the season 10-1. In 2019, the team won the North II Group V sectional title, the program's first in more than a quarter century, with a 42–28 win against Clifton High School in the championship game. The school's rivalry with Linden High School, with games played on Thanksgiving Day (or the day before Thanksgiving) for more than 75 years, was listed at 13th on NJ.com's 2017 list "Ranking the 31 fiercest rivalries in N.J. HS football". Union leads the rivalry with a 37–32–5 overall record as of 2017.

The softball team won the Group IV state title in 1989, defeating Middletown High School North by a score of 3-1 in the championship game. The team won the North II Group IV state championship in 2009 and were the runner-ups in the Group IV final game against Williamstown High School.

The boys' basketball team won the Group IV state championship in 1997, coming back from being down 10 points in the fourth quarter to defeat Atlantic City High School by a score of 61-50 in the tournament final played at Boardwalk Hall.

In May 2008, the school's Armed Drill Team took first place at the nationals in the challenger level.

== Administration ==
The school's principal is Althea Bossard. Her core administration team includes four vice principals, one for each grade.

== Notable alumni ==
- Isa Abdul-Quddus (born 1989), NFL football player for the New Orleans Saints
- Aminat Ayinde (class of 2004), contestant on Cycle 12 of America's Next Top Model
- Peter J. Biondi (1942–2011), politician who represented the 16th Legislative District in the New Jersey General Assembly from 1998 until his death in 2011
- Nija Charles (born 1997, class of 2015), three-time Grammy Award winning songwriter and record producer
- George Chapla (class of 1968), retired soccer defender who played one season each in the North American Soccer League and the American Soccer League
- Dave D'Addio (1961–2017), former running back for the Detroit Lions
- Davison Igbinosun (born 2004), American football cornerback for the Ohio State Buckeyes
- Larry Kubin (born 1959, class of 1977), former NFL linebacker who played with the Washington Redskins, Buffalo Bills, and Tampa Bay Buccaneers
- Kelly Kulick (born 1977), professional bowler
- Artie Lange (born 1967), comedian and mainstay of The Howard Stern Show
- Ray Liotta (1954–2022), actor who appeared in Goodfellas, Field of Dreams and Narc
- Elliott Maddox (born 1947, class of 1966), Major League Baseball outfielder
- Eulace Peacock (1914–1996, class of 1933), track and field athlete in the 1930s who bested Jesse Owens at several meets but never made it to the 1936 Summer Olympics due to an injury
- Sylvia Pogorzelski (born 1985), Miss New Jersey USA 2005
- Philip Rubin (born 1949, class of 1967), chief executive officer emeritus of Haskins Laboratories and White House science adviser
- Al Santorini (born 1948), Major League Baseball pitcher who played for the Atlanta Braves, San Diego Padres and St. Louis Cardinals
- Linda Simensky (class of 1981), business executive who served as a creative executive for Nickelodeon and cartoon Network
- Amy Simon (born 1971), planetary scientist at NASA's Goddard Space Flight Center
- Darnell Stapleton (born 1985), offensive guard for the Pittsburgh Steelers
- Travis Taylor (born 1990), professional basketball player
- Sam T. Timer (1926–2010), American football coach who was head coach of the Allegheny Gators football team for 14 seasons
- Robert Wuhl (born 1951), star of the HBO series Arliss, stand up comedian, and supporting actor in the original Batman movie directed by Tim Burton
- Darren Young (born 1979), professional wrestler
