= Linden High School (New Jersey) =

High school in Union County, New Jersey, US

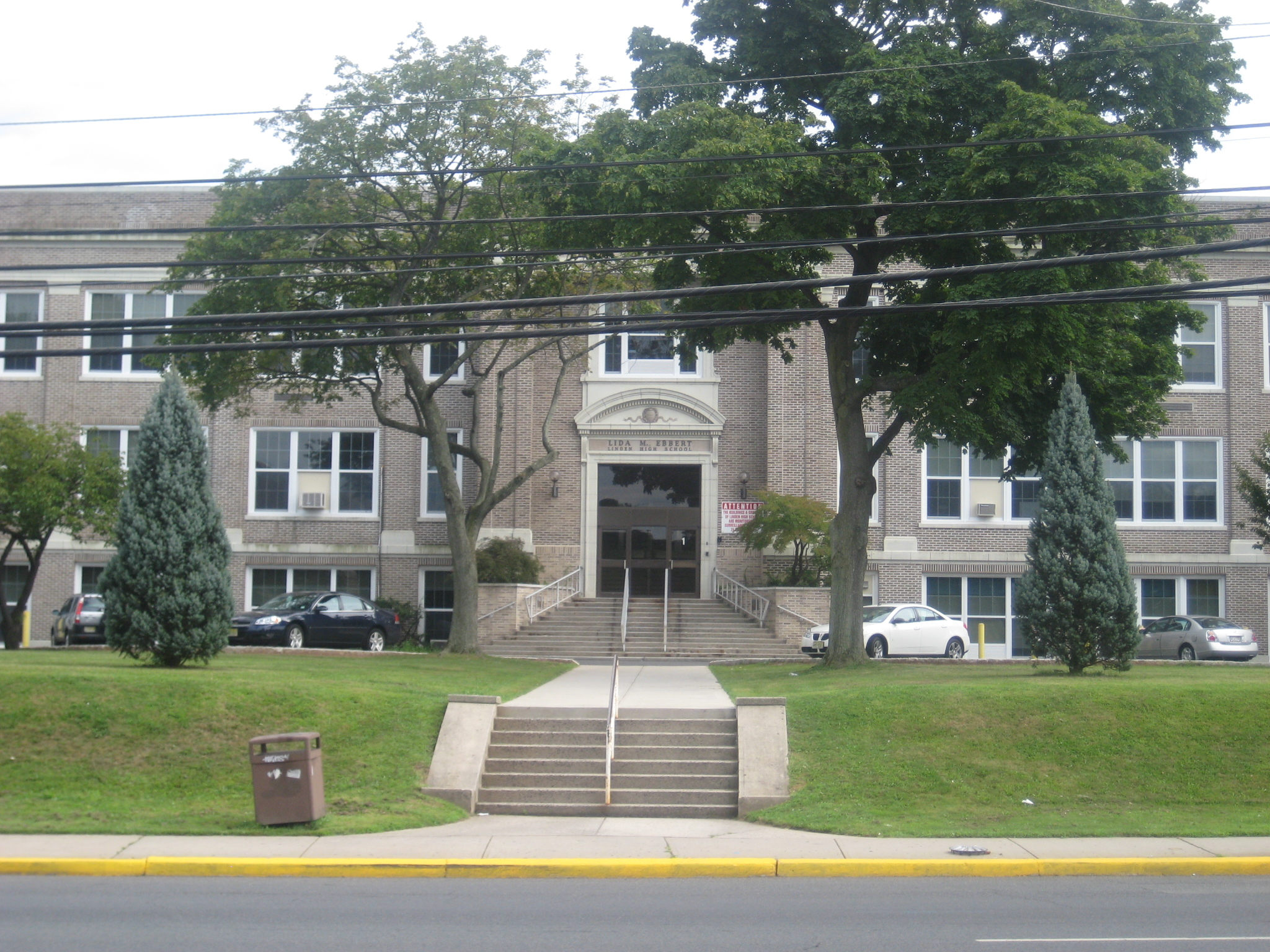

Location
- 121 West Saint George Avenue; Linden, Union County, New Jersey 07036; United States; 40.635999°N 74.26526°W

Information
- Type: Public high school
- Established: 1910
- School district: Linden Public Schools
- NCES School ID: 340861005556
- Principal: Charles Koonce
- Faculty: 142.0 FTEs
- Grades: 9-12
- Enrollment: 1,934 (as of 2024–25)
- Student to teacher ratio: 13.6:1
- Colors: Orange and black
- Athletics conference: Union County Interscholastic Athletic Conference (general); Big Central Football Conference (football)
- Team name: Tigers
- Rival: Union High School
- Website: www.lindenps.org/o/lhs

Linden High School is a comprehensive community public high school located in Linden in Union County, in the U.S. state of New Jersey, serving students in ninth through twelfth grades as the lone secondary school of the Linden Public Schools. The school has been accredited by the Middle States Association of Colleges and Schools Commission on Elementary and Secondary Schools since 1928.

As of the 2024–25 school year, the school had an enrollment of 1,934 students and 142.0 classroom teachers (on an FTE basis), for a student–teacher ratio of 13.6:1. There were 1,119 students (57.9% of enrollment) eligible for free lunch and 186 (9.6% of students) eligible for reduced-cost lunch.

Linden High School has been an IB World School since July 2001, offering students the IB Diploma Programme.

== History ==
Linden High School opened for start of the 1910–11 school year, with a graduating class that included three students. The high school had been located in School No. 1 until a standalone high school building opened to students in 1925, with expansions made to the original building in 1931 and 1960. A plaque in the school honors Lida M. Ebbert, who was the school's principal from when it was established in 1910 until she retired in 1952.

== Awards, recognition and rankings ==
The school was the 253rd-ranked public high school in New Jersey out of 339 schools statewide in New Jersey Monthly magazine's September 2014 cover story on the state's “Top Public High Schools,” using a new ranking methodology. The school had been ranked 326th in the state of 328 schools in 2012, after being ranked 284th in 2010 out of 322 schools listed. The magazine ranked the school 299th in 2008 out of 316 schools. The school was ranked 293rd in the magazine's September 2006 issue, which surveyed 316 schools across the state.

== Athletics ==
The Linden High School Tigers compete in the Union County Interscholastic Athletic Conference, which is comprised of public and private high schools in Union County and was established following a reorganization of sports leagues in Northern New Jersey by the New Jersey State Interscholastic Athletic Association (NJSIAA). With 1,202 students in grades 10–12, the school was classified by the NJSIAA for the 2019–20 school year as Group IV for most athletic competition purposes, which included schools with an enrollment of 1,060 to 5,049 students in that grade range. Prior to the 2010 realignment, the school had participated in the Watchung Conference, which included public high schools in Essex, Hudson and Union counties. The football team competes in Division 4 of the Big Central Football Conference, which includes 60 public and private high schools in Hunterdon, Middlesex, Somerset, Union and Warren counties, which are broken down into 10 divisions by size and location. The school was classified by the NJSIAA as Group V North for football for 2024–2026, which included schools with 1,317 to 5,409 students.

The boys' track team won the Group III spring / outdoor track state championship in 1941.

The boys' baseball team won the Group IV state championship in 1979 (against Middletown High School South in the final game of the tournament), and won the Group III title in 1981 (vs. Moorestown High School) and 1982 (vs. Freehold Township High School). The 1979 team finished the season with an 18-6 record after winning the Group IV title with a 2-1 victory on a run scored in the bottom of the ninth in the championship game against Middletown South.

The football team won the North II Group III state sectional title in 1985 and the North II Group V title in 2014. In 2014, the team defeated Elizabeth High School by a score of 27–20 in the tournament final to win the North II Group V championship. The school's rivalry with Union High School, with games played on Thanksgiving Day (or the day before Thanksgiving) for more than 75 years, was listed at 13th on NJ.com's 2017 list "Ranking the 31 fiercest rivalries in N.J. HS football". Union leads the rivalry with a 37–32–5 overall record as of 2017.

The boys' bowling team won the overall state championship in 1988 and the Group III title in 2020.

The girls' basketball team won the Group IV state title in 1992 (vs. Piscataway High School), 1993 (vs. East Brunswick High School) and 1994 (vs. Washington Township High School). The 1993 team won the Group IV title with a 71-55 win against East Brunswick in the championship game. The 1994 team won the Group IV title with a 58-52 win against a Washington Township team that came into the championship game undefeated.

The boys' basketball team won the Group IV state championship in 2000 (defeating Bridgewater-Raritan High School in the tournament final), 2004 (vs. Atlantic City High School), 2007 (vs. South Brunswick High School), 2014 (vs. Trenton Central High School), 2016 (vs. Atlantic City High School) and 2017 (vs. Shawnee High School). Coached by Phil Colicchio, the boys' basketball team won the 2006 North II, Group IV sectional championship with a 64–38 win over Plainfield High School. In 2007, the team won the Group IV NJSIAA state championship, edging Passaic County Technical Institute 57–56 in the semifinals and defeating South Brunswick High School 63-54 for the title. The team won the program's fourth Group IV title in 2014 with a 66-53 win against Trenton Central in the finals of the tournament.

== Administration ==
The school's principal is Charles Koonce. His administration team includes four vice principals, one for each grade.

== Notable alumni ==
- Roger Chanoine (1976–2016), offensive tackle who played in the NFL between 1998 and 2002, primarily for the Cleveland Browns
- John Charles (1944–2019, class of 1962), former American football cornerback and safety who played eight seasons in the National Football League
- Jerome A. Cohen (1930–2025), professor of law at New York University School of Law and an expert in Chinese law
- Danny Dias (c. 1983–2017), activist and reality television personality
- Tamecka Dixon (born 1975, class of 1993), former professional basketball player who played in the WNBA for the Los Angeles Sparks, Houston Comets and Indiana Fever
- Waliyy Dixon (born 1974), aka "Main Event" on the AND1 Mixtape Tour; one of the original players on the famous AND1–sponsored streetball tours
- Carolyn Dorin-Ballard (born 1964, class of 1985), one of the top female ten-pin bowlers
- Calvin Duncan (born 1961), pastor and retired basketball player
- Stanton T. Friedman (1934–2019, class of 1951), nuclear engineer and ufologist who broke the story of the 1947 Roswell incident
- Oscar Givens (1922–1967), Negro league baseball infielder in the 1940s who played for the Newark Eagles
- John T. Hendrickson Jr. (1923–1999), politician who represented the 9th Legislative District from 1982 to 1989
- George Hudak (1935–1996), politician who represented the 20th Legislative District in the New Jersey General Assembly from 1986 to 1994 and was mayor of Linden from 1983 to 1987
- Frank Jeckell (born 1945/1946, class of 1964), musician, best known as the original guitarist for 1910 Fruitgum Company
- Eddie Kasko (1931–2020), former infielder, manager, scout and front office executive in Major League Baseball
- Thomas Lanigan-Schmidt (born 1948, Thomas R. R. Schmidt), artist and veteran of the Stonewall riots
- Otis Livingston II (born 1996), professional basketball player who plays for Bàsquet Girona of the Spanish Liga ACB
- Derek Luke (born 1974), actor who won multiple awards for his big-screen debut performance in the 2002 film Antwone Fisher
- Vincent Obsitnik (born 1938), diplomat who served as United States Ambassador to Slovakia
- Mike Pringley (born 1976, class of 1994), former American football defensive end who played in the NFL for the Detroit Lions and San Diego Chargers
- Jon Rua (born 1983, class of 2001), actor, singer and choreographer who appeared in the Broadway hit Hamilton
- Troy Stradford (born 1964, class of 1982), former professional American football running back who played for six seasons in the NFL
- Craig Taylor (born 1966, class of 1984), former running back for three seasons for the Cincinnati Bengals
- Chester A. Weidenburner (1913-1985, class of 1931), lawyer and judge who served as U.S. Attorney for the District of New Jersey and as a Judge of the New Jersey Superior Court
- Muhammad Wilkerson (born 1989, class of 2007), defensive end who played for the New York Jets of the National Football League

== Notable faculty ==
- John J. Fay Jr. (1927–2003), history and economics teacher from 1958 to 1978, who served in the New Jersey General Assembly and the New Jersey Senate
