= Oratory Preparatory School =

Catholic school in Summit, New Jersey, US

Location
- 425 Morris Avenue; Summit, (Union County), New Jersey 07901; United States
- 40°43′27″N 74°22′10″W

Information
- Type: Private, All-Boys
- Motto: Fidelitas (Faithfulness)
- Religious affiliation: Roman Catholic
- Established: 1907
- School code: 311435
- NCES School ID: A2390357
- Head of school: Robert Costello
- Faculty: 38.6 FTEs
- Grades: 7–12
- Enrollment: 363 (as of 2023–24)
- Student to teacher ratio: 9.4:1
- Campus: Suburban
- Campus size: 11 acres (45,000 m^{2})
- Colors: Navy; Gold
- Athletics: 11 varsity sports
- Athletics conference: Union County Interscholastic Athletic Conference
- Team name: Rams
- Accreditation: Middle States Association of Colleges and Schools
- Publication: The Phoenix (literary/art magazine)
- Newspaper: The Omega
- Yearbook: Aries
- School fees: $300 (2025–26)
- Tuition: $30,990 (2026–27)
- Affiliation: Roman Catholic Archdiocese of Newark
- Website: www.oratoryprep.org

Oratory Preparatory School, commonly known as Oratory Prep, is a Roman Catholic college preparatory day school for boys in grades 7-12, located in Summit, in Union County, in the U.S. state of New Jersey, approximately 19 miles (31 km) west of Manhattan. The school is located one block away from the Kent Place School and is in close proximity to Summit High School.

As of the 2023–24 school year, the school had an enrollment of 363 students and 38.6 classroom teachers (on an FTE basis), for a student–teacher ratio of 9.4:1. The school's student body was 66.9% (243) White, 11.3% (41) Hispanic, 7.4% (27) Black and 5.5% (20) two or more races and 4.4% (16) Asian.

== Overview ==
The school is associated with the Roman Catholic Archdiocese of Newark. Oratory Preparatory School is a member of the New Jersey Association of Independent Schools. The school has been accredited by the Middle States Association of Colleges and Schools Commission on Elementary and Secondary Schools since 1973.

The school was founded in 1907 as Carlton Academy, with grades 4-12. Most of the students lived on campus. Tuition for the 2026–27 academic year is $30,990 and a $300 registration fee is required; this does not include costs for transportation, books and meals. The school has stated that 100% of Oratory seniors ultimately attend college.

== Awards, recognition and rankings ==
In 2015, the United States Department of Education announced that Oratory had been recognized with the National Blue Ribbon School Award of Excellence, the Education Department's highest honor. Oratory was one of 15 schools in the state and one of two private secondary schools across the nation to receive this distinction.

== History ==
Oratory originally resided on a 15-acre (61,000 m^{2}) lot, but was reduced to its current eleven after selling off a portion of land in the 1960s. In 1967, the school was sold to the Archdiocese of Newark after running into financial difficulties. Among century-old specimen trees and rolling hills, the campus consists of two main academic buildings, athletic fields, and a prayer garden.

In 2006, the land was assessed at $6,270,000, and the buildings at $2,752,700, a total of $9,022,700.

== Athletics ==
The Oratory Prep Rams compete in the Union County Interscholastic Athletic Conference, following a reorganization of sports leagues in Northern New Jersey by the New Jersey State Interscholastic Athletic Association (NJSIAA). Prior to the NJSIAA's 2009 realignment, the school had participated in the Mountain Valley Conference, which included public and private high schools in Essex County, Somerset County and Union County. With 500 students in grades 10-12, the school was classified by the NJSIAA for the 2019–20 school year as Non-Public A for most athletic competition purposes, which included schools with an enrollment of 381 to 1,454 students in that grade range (equivalent to Group II for public schools).

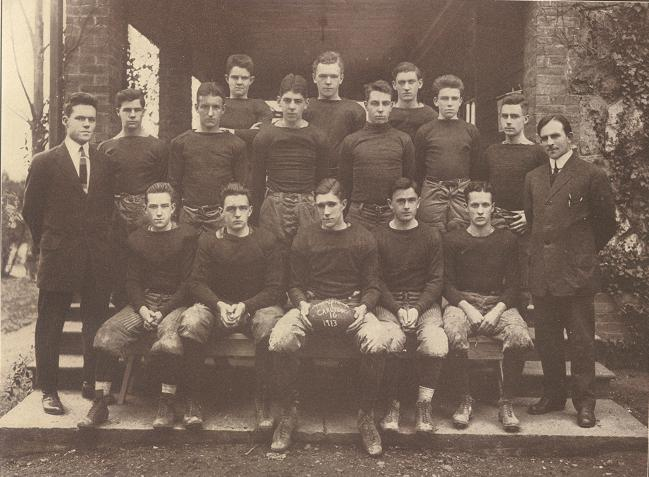
Carlton Academy's first football team. Photograph circa 1913.

The boys track team won the indoor / winter track Non-Public Group B state championship in 1980. The boys' track team won the Non-Public indoor relay state championship in 1980. The spring / outdoor track team won the New Jersey Prep B Championship two years running (2009 and 2010). The track team won the inaugural winter track Prep B championship in February 2011. The boys track team placed 5th in the 1600 Sprint Medley Championship at Nike Outdoor Nationals 2023 in Eugene, Oregon, competing under the name "Ram Nation Track Club"; the relay team would go on to be named All-Americans.

The boys cross country running team won the Non-Public Group C state championship in 1974 (as co-champion) and 1975.

Oratory Golf's home course is Canoe Brook Country Club. The golf team was NJSIAA Non Public B State Champions in 2004–05, and won the NJSIAA Prep B state championship in 2005-06. For the 2006 season, the Oratory golf team was ranked 20th in the state by The Star-Ledger.

For 14 consecutive years through 2009, the swim team won the Mountain Valley Conference and won the NJ Prep B Championship in 2004. The varsity baseball team were conference champions in 2006, a feat not accomplished since 1956, and had a perfect in-conference record of 12-0.

=== Mock Trial ===
The mock trial team, sponsored by the New Jersey State Bar Foundation, began at Oratory in 2003. In 2007 the team finished third in the state, and in 2016 finished 2nd in the state at the state championships. In 2007 the team finished fifth in the nation at the American Mock Trial Invitational held in New Jersey.

== Noted alumni ==
- Brian Belott (born 1973), artist, performer and found object art collector
- Richard Codey (1946–2026), Governor of New Jersey
- Danny DeVito (born 1944), actor
- Justin Brice Guariglia, photographer for National Geographic magazine
- Vincent Kearney, politician who has been a Garwood councilmember and is representative-elect of the New Jersey General Assembly's 21st district
- William J. Lyons Jr. (1921–2014), politician who served from 1973 to 1975 in the Connecticut Senate
