= Linden Public Schools =

School district in Union County, New Jersey, US

Address
- 2 East Gibbons Street Linden, Union County, New Jersey, 07036; United States
- Coordinates: 40.63539°N 74.26087°W

District information
- Grades: PreK-12
- Superintendent: Atiya Y. Perkins
- Business administrator: John Serpiglia
- Schools: 11

Students and staff
- Enrollment: 6,125 (as of 2022–23)
- Faculty: 557.0 FTEs
- Student–teacher ratio: 11.0:1

Other information
- District Factor Group: B
- Website: lindenps.org
Ind.	Per pupil	District spending	Rank (*)	K-12 average	%± vs. average
1A	Total Spending	$19,039	62	$18,891	0.8%
1	Budgetary Cost	15,478	69	14,783	4.7%
2	Classroom Instruction	9,470	80	8,763	8.1%
6	Support Services	2,172	45	2,392	−9.2%
8	Administrative Cost	1,641	83	1,485	10.5%
10	Operations & Maintenance	1,971	82	1,783	10.5%
13	Extracurricular Activities	216	38	268	−19.4%
16	Median Teacher Salary	63,111	40	64,043
Data from NJDoE 2014 Taxpayers' Guide to Education Spending. *Of K-12 districts with more than 3,500 students. Lowest spending=1; Highest=103

The Linden Public Schools are a comprehensive community public school district that serves students in pre-kindergarten through twelfth grade from Linden, in Union County, in the U.S. state of New Jersey.

As of the 2022–23 school year, the district, comprised of 11 schools, had an enrollment of 6,125 students and 557.0 classroom teachers (on an FTE basis), for a student–teacher ratio of 11.0:1.

The district is classified by the New Jersey Department of Education as being in District Factor Group "B", the seventh-highest of eight groupings. District Factor Groups organize districts statewide to allow comparison by common socioeconomic characteristics of the local districts. From lowest socioeconomic status to highest, the categories are A, B, CD, DE, FG, GH, I and J.

== Awards and recognition ==
School No. 5 was one of nine schools in New Jersey honored in 2020 by the National Blue Ribbon Schools Program, which recognizes high student achievement.

The district was selected as one of the top "100 Best Communities for Higher Music Education in America" in 2006, 2015 and 2016 by the American Music Conference.

== Schools ==
Schools in the district (with 2022–23 enrollment data from the National Center for Education Statistics) are: Elementary schools

- School No. 1 (with 374 students; in grades PreK–5)
  - Petra Liz-Morell, interim principal
- School No. 2 (584; PreK–5)
  - Peter Fingerlin, principal
- School No. 4 (437; PreK–5)
  - Suzanne Olivero, principal
- School No. 5 (290; PreK–5)
  - Rachelle Crawley, principal
- School No. 6 (332; PreK–5)
  - Michael Walters, Principal
- School No. 8 (300; PreK–5)
  - Michelle Rodriguez, principal
- School No. 9 (324; PreK–5)
  - Angela A. Principato, Principal
- School No. 10 (242; PreK–5)
  - Wayne Happel, principal

Middle schools

- Myles J. McManus Middle School (696; 6–8)
  - William Mastriano, Principal
- Joseph E. Soehl Middle School (662; 6–8)
  - Gwendolyn Long, principal

High school

- Linden High School (1,801; 9–12)
  - Charles Koonce, principal

== Administration ==
Core members of the district's administration are:

- Atiya Y. Perkins, superintendent
- John Serapiglia, business administrator

== Board of education ==
The district's board of education, comprised of nine members, sets policy and oversees the fiscal and educational operation of the district through its administration. As a Type II school district, the board's trustees are elected directly by voters to serve three-year terms of office on a staggered basis, with three seats up for election each year held (since 2012) as part of the November general election. The board appoints a superintendent to oversee the district's day-to-day operations and a business administrator to supervise the business functions of the district.
