= Cranford Township Public Schools =

School district in Union County, New Jersey, US

Address
- 132 Thomas Street Cranford, Union County, New Jersey, 07016; United States
- Coordinates: 40.65346°N 74.297059°W

District information
- Grades: PreK-12
- Superintendent: Scott Rubin
- Business administrator: Robert J. Carfagno
- Schools: 7

Students and staff
- Enrollment: 3,745 (as of 2022–23)
- Faculty: 334.1 FTEs
- Student–teacher ratio: 11.2:1

Other information
- District Factor Group: I
- Website: www.cranfordschools.org
Ind.	Per pupil	District spending	Rank (*)	K-12 average	%± vs. average
1A	Total Spending	$16,494	23	$18,891	−12.7%
1	Budgetary Cost	13,514	34	14,783	−8.6%
2	Classroom Instruction	8,122	25	8,763	−7.3%
6	Support Services	2,186	46	2,392	−8.6%
8	Administrative Cost	1,482	58	1,485	−0.2%
10	Operations & Maintenance	1,380	24	1,783	−22.6%
13	Extracurricular Activities	315	76	268	17.5%
16	Median Teacher Salary	63,767	45	64,043
Data from NJDoE 2014 Taxpayers' Guide to Education Spending. *Of K-12 districts with more than 3,500 students. Lowest spending=1; Highest=103

The Cranford Township Public Schools is a comprehensive public school district serving students in pre-Kindergarten through twelfth grade in Cranford in Union County, in the U.S. state of New Jersey. The district is governed by a nine-member elected board of education.

As of the 2022–23 school year, the district, comprised of seven schools, had an enrollment of 3,745 students and 334.1 classroom teachers (on an FTE basis), for a student–teacher ratio of 11.2:1.

The district is classified by the New Jersey Department of Education as being in District Factor Group "I", the second-highest of eight groupings. District Factor Groups organize districts statewide to allow comparison by common socioeconomic characteristics of the local districts. From lowest socioeconomic status to highest, the categories are A, B, CD, DE, FG, GH, I and J.

== Schools ==
Schools in the district (with 2022–23 enrollment data from the National Center for Education Statistics) are:

Elementary / middle schools

- Bloomingdale Avenue School with 233 students in grades K-2
  - Kristen D'Anna, principal
- Brookside Place School with 355 students in grades K-5
  - Michael Klimko, principal
- Hillside Avenue School with 734 students in grades K-8
  - Kevin Deacon, principal
- Livingston Avenue School with 253 students in grades 3-5
  - Cari Lopez, principal
- Orange Avenue School with 765 students in grades 3-8
  - Lourdes Murphy, principal
- Walnut Avenue School with 294 students in grades PreK-2
  - Celine McNally, principal
- Cranford High School with 1,095 students in grades 9-12
  - Mark Cantagallo, principal

The system's high school was the 49th-ranked public high school in New Jersey out of 339 schools statewide in New Jersey Monthly magazine's September 2014 cover story on the state's "Top Public High Schools", using a new ranking methodology, after having been ranked 51st in the state out of 328 schools in 2012. Cranford High School has a curriculum which has a strong push for technology in the schools, along with stressing service learning. The high school is recognized for its work in service learning and for being a national school of character. Cranford High School students are regularly admitted to some of the nation's top public and private universities, with over 90% of each graduating class going onto college.

Cranford has two public middle schools, Orange Avenue School and Hillside Avenue School, which are located on each end of the township and serve their local neighborhood. Both also are elementary schools as well. On the north side of Cranford, along with Orange Avenue, are two other elementary schools, Bloomingdale Avenue School and Brookside Place School. On the south side of the township, along with Hillside Avenue, are two other elementary schools, Walnut Avenue School and Livingston Avenue School.

Lincoln School, which is the home of the district's administrative offices, also houses the district's two alternative education programs, CAP and CAMP.

- Dennis McCaffery, principal

== Awards and recognition ==
The district was selected as one of the top "100 Best Communities for Music Education in America 2005" by the American Music Conference.

== Administration ==
Core members of the district's administration are:

- Scott Rubin, superintendent
- Robert J. Carfagno, business administrator and board secretary

== Board of education ==
The district's board of education, comprised of nine members, sets policy and oversees the fiscal and educational operation of the district through its administration. As a Type II school district, the board's trustees are elected directly by voters to serve three-year terms of office on a staggered basis, with three seats up for election each year held (since 2012) as part of the November general election. The board appoints a superintendent to oversee the district's day-to-day operations and a business administrator to supervise the business functions of the district.

== Notable alumni ==
- William Sperry Beinecke (born 1914), founder of the Central Park Conservancy and former chairman of S&H Green Stamps.
- Carol Blazejowski (born 1956), member of Basketball Hall of Fame and 1974 Cranford High School graduate.
- Robert Ferro (1941–1988), Cranford High School alumnus and author whose work included a gay coming-of-age novel describing a fictionalized version of Cranford centered around the Rahway River.
