= Union County Conference =

The Union County Conference (UCC) is a New Jersey high school sports association operating under the jurisdiction of the New Jersey State Interscholastic Athletic Association (NJSIAA). The league consists of 26 public and parochial high schools in Union County in central New Jersey.

== Schools ==
- David Brearley High School
- Abraham Clark High School
- Cranford High School
- Jonathan Dayton High School
- Elizabeth High School
- Governor Livingston High School
- Hillside High School
- Arthur L. Johnson High School
- Union County Vocational-Technical High School
- Linden High School
- New Providence High School
- Kent Place School
- Oak Knoll School
- Oratory Preparatory School
- Plainfield High School
- Rahway High School
- Roselle Catholic High School
- Roselle Park High School
- St. Patrick High School
- Scotch Plains-Fanwood High School
- Summit High School
- Union High School
- Union Catholic High School
- Westfield High School
