= Union Public School District (New Jersey) =

School district in Union County, New Jersey, US

Township of Union Public School District

Address
- 2369 Morris Avenue Union Township, Union County, New Jersey, 07083; United States
- Coordinates: 40.7012°N 74.2862°W

District information
- Grades: PreK-12
- Superintendent: Gerry Benaquista
- Business administrator: Yolanda Koon
- Schools: 10

Students and staff
- Enrollment: 7,503 (as of 2021–22)
- Faculty: 576.7 FTEs
- Student–teacher ratio: 13.0:1

Other information
- District Factor Group: DE
- Website: www.tups.org
| Ind. | Per pupil | District spending | Rank (*) | K-12 average | %± vs. average |
|---|---|---|---|---|---|
| 1A | Total Spending | $17,089 | 28 | $18,891 | −9.5% |
| 1 | Budgetary Cost | 13,501 | 33 | 14,783 | −8.7% |
| 2 | Classroom Instruction | 8,222 | 31 | 8,763 | −6.2% |
| 6 | Support Services | 2,037 | 36 | 2,392 | −14.8% |
| 8 | Administrative Cost | 1,394 | 43 | 1,485 | −6.1% |
| 10 | Operations & Maintenance | 1,598 | 47 | 1,783 | −10.4% |
| 13 | Extracurricular Activities | 170 | 20 | 268 | −36.6% |
| 16 | Median Teacher Salary | 67,707 | 70 | 64,043 |
Data from NJDoE 2014 Taxpayers' Guide to Education Spending. *Of K-12 districts with more than 3,500 students. Lowest spending=1; Highest=103

The Union Public School District is a comprehensive community public school district that serves students in pre-kindergarten through twelfth grade from Union Township, in Union County, in the U.S. state of New Jersey.

As of the 2021–22 school year, the district, comprised of 10 schools, had an enrollment of 7,503 students and 576.7 classroom teachers (on an FTE basis), for a student–teacher ratio of 13.0:1.

The district is classified by the New Jersey Department of Education as being in District Factor Group "DE", the fifth-highest of eight groupings. District Factor Groups organize districts statewide to allow comparison by common socioeconomic characteristics of the local districts. From lowest socioeconomic status to highest, the categories are A, B, CD, DE, FG, GH, I and J.

== History ==
In 1969, the Union school district was threatened with being the first town north of the Mason–Dixon line to be penalized for school segregation. The area of Vauxhall was primarily black and Jefferson Elementary School was disproportionately black compared to the rest of the town. Union avoided problems by converting Jefferson Elementary into a sixth-grade only school called Central 6 and bused all children in the district in 6th grade to Jefferson Elementary School. It was later renamed Central 5 housing all fifth-grade students because the two junior highs, Burnet and Kawameeh, became middle schools and took on sixth grade students.

== Schools ==
The schools in the district (with 2021–22 enrollment data from the National Center for Education Statistics) are:

Elementary schools

- Battle Hill Elementary School (379 students; in grades PreK-4)
  - Sharon Drayton, interim principal
- Hannah Caldwell Elementary School (646; PreK-4)
  - Mark Hoyt, principal
- Connecticut Farms Elementary School (382; PreK-4)
  - Michelle C. Osborne-Warren, principal
- Franklin Elementary School (468; PreK-4)
  - Kira Baskerville-Williams, principal
- Livingston Elementary School (420; PreK-4)
  - Benjamin Kloc, principal
- Washington Elementary School (558; PreK-4)
  - Thomas O. Matthews, principal
- Jefferson Elementary School (524; grade 5)
  - Kelly Piano, interim principal

Middle schools

- Burnet Middle School (977; 6–8)
  - David Shaw, principal
- Kawameeh Middle School (728; 6–8)
  - Jason Malanda, principal

High school

- Union High School (2,270; 9–12)
  - Althea Bossard, interim principal

== Administration ==
Core members of the district's administration are:

- Gerry Benaquista, superintendent
- Yolanda Koon, school business administrator and board secretary

== Board of education ==
The district's board of education, comprised of nine members, sets policy and oversees the fiscal and educational operation of the district through its administration. As a Type II school district, the board's trustees are elected directly by voters to serve three-year terms of office on a staggered basis, with three seats up for election each year held (since 2012) as part of the November general election. The board appoints a superintendent to oversee the district's day-to-day operations and a business administrator to supervise the business functions of the district.
