= Union Township, Union County, New Jersey =

Township in Union County, New Jersey, US

Union Township, New Jersey
- Township
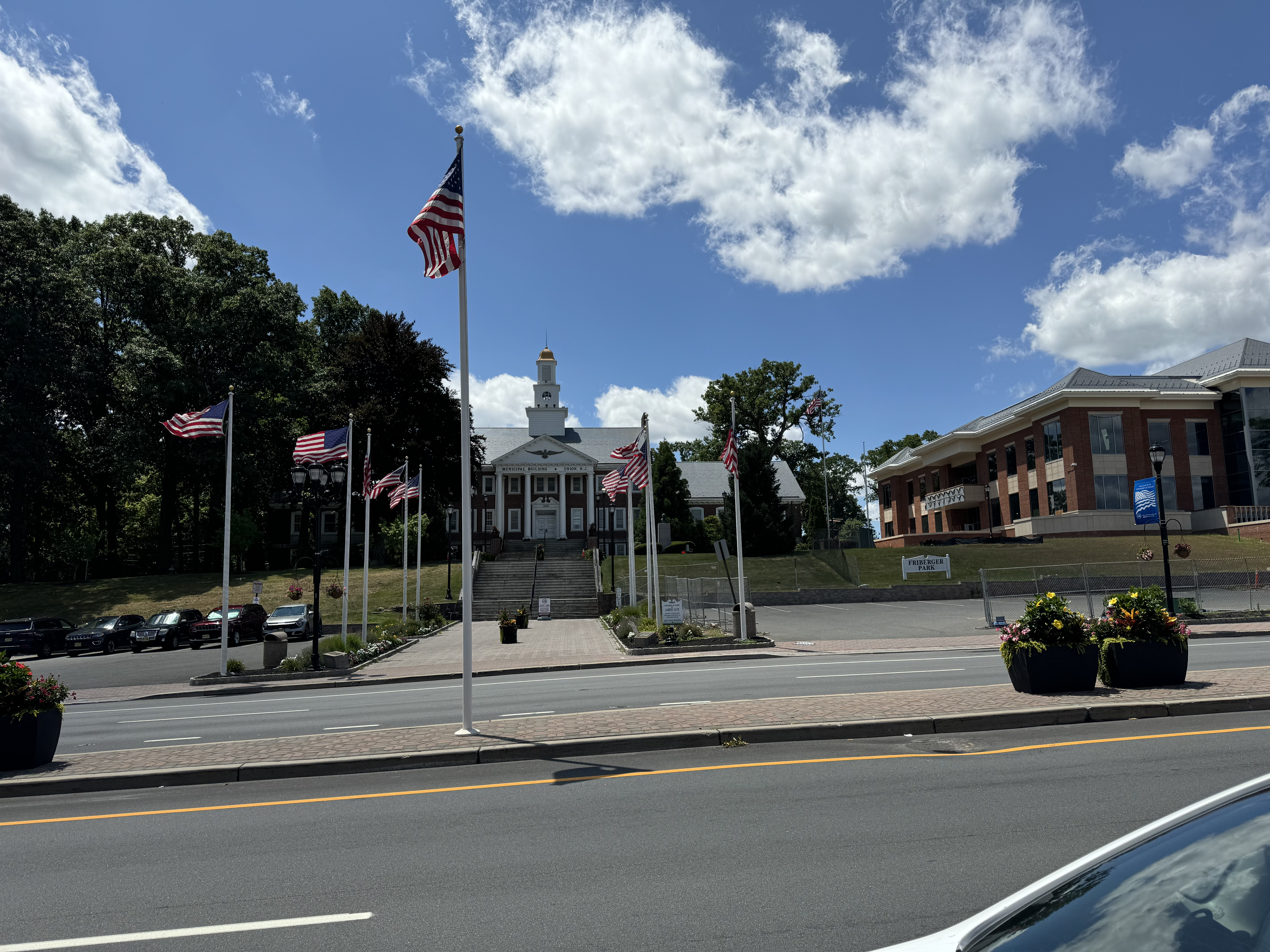
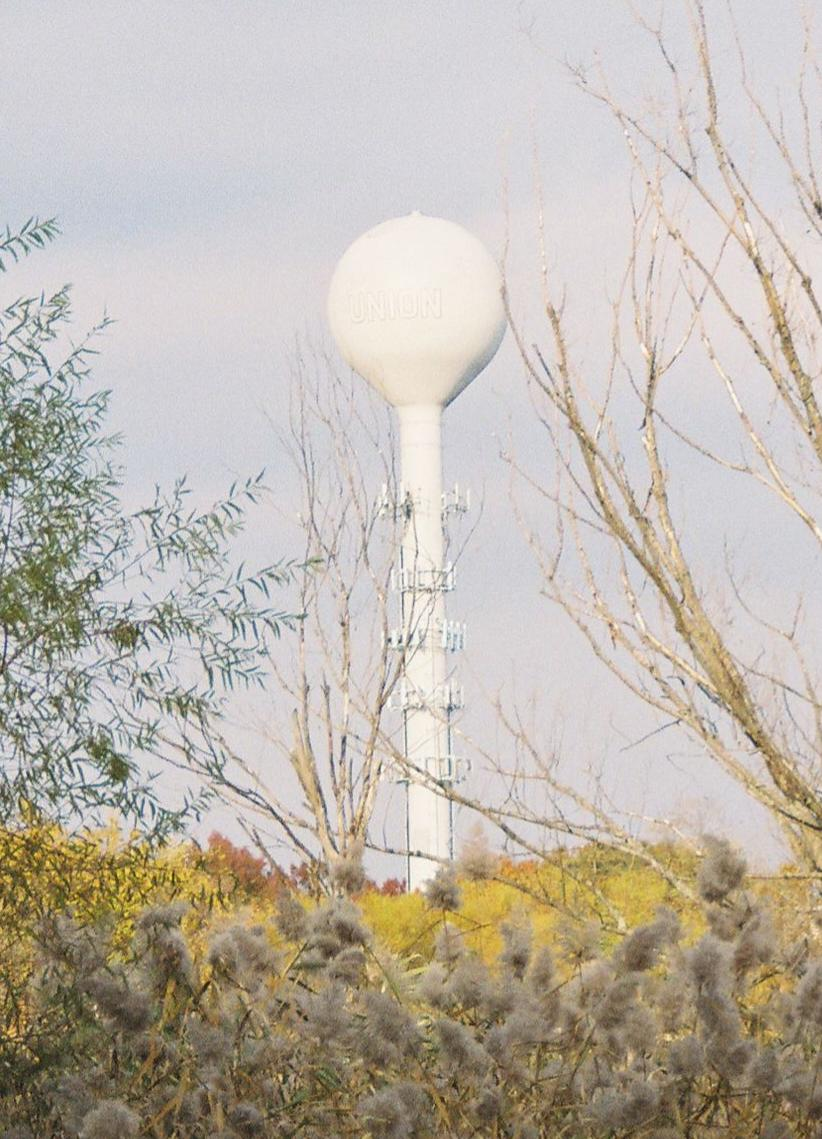
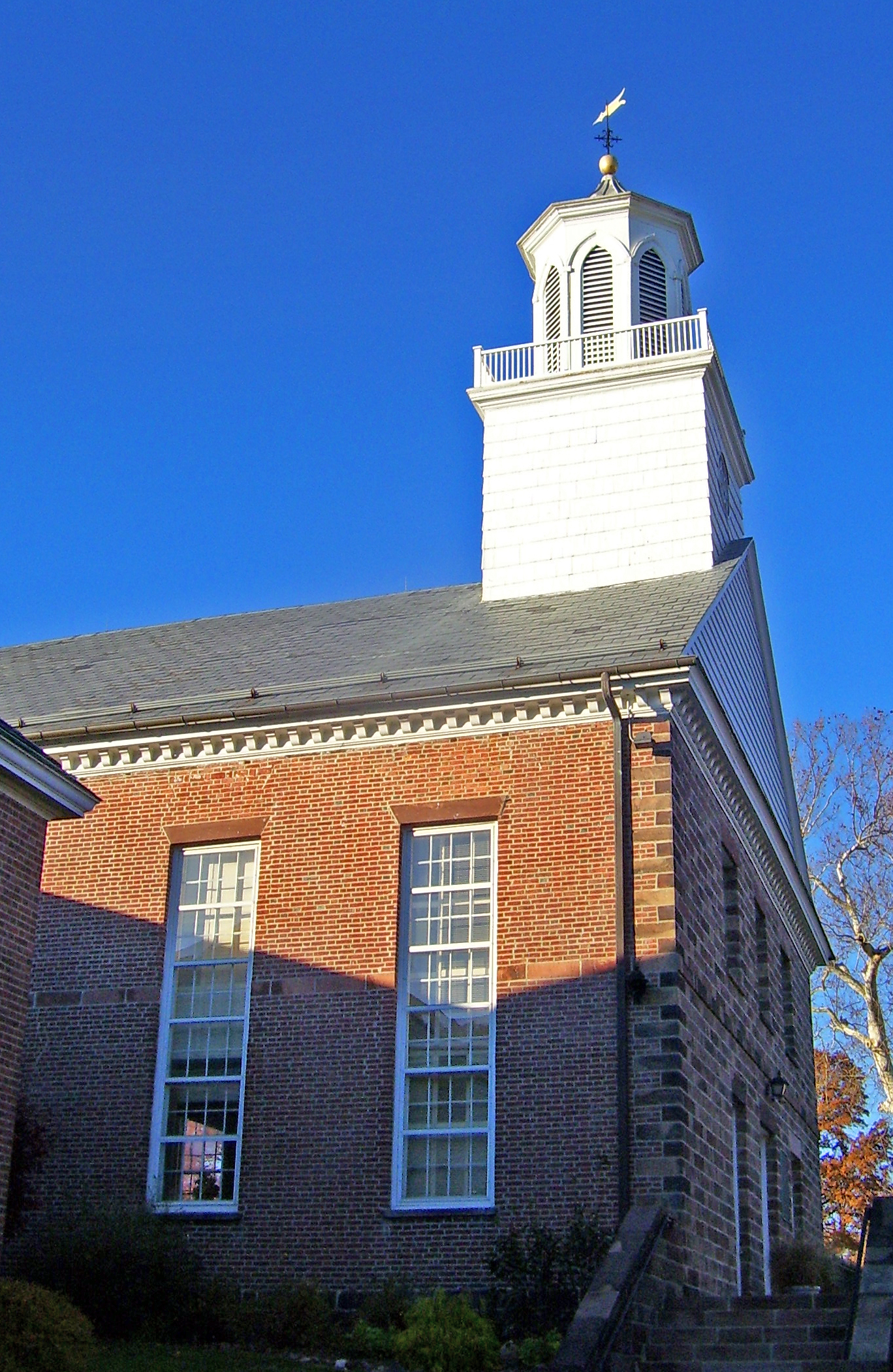
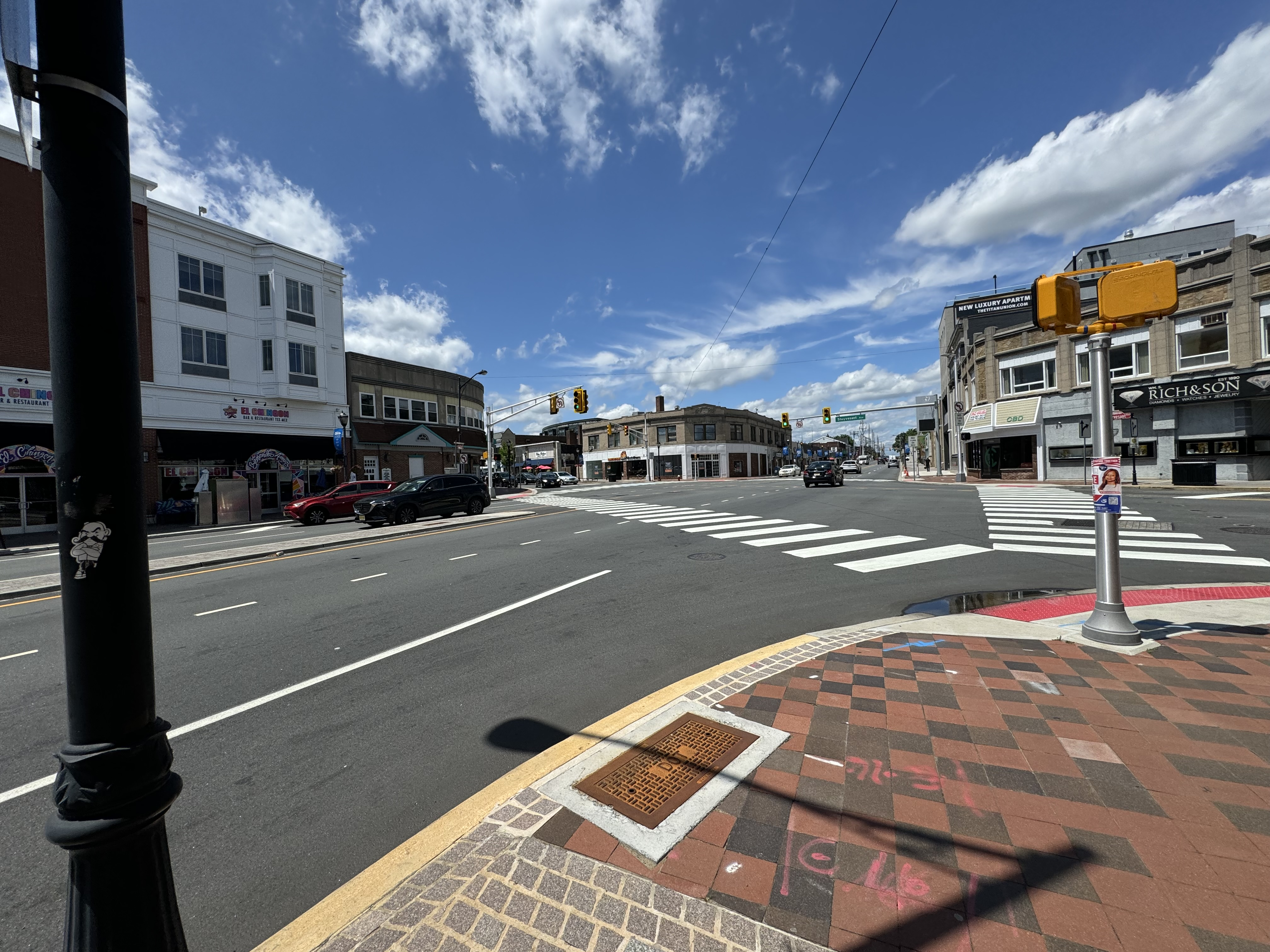
- Union Municipal Building and Library Union Watersphere Connecticut Farms Presbyterian Church Downtown Union

- Flag Seal

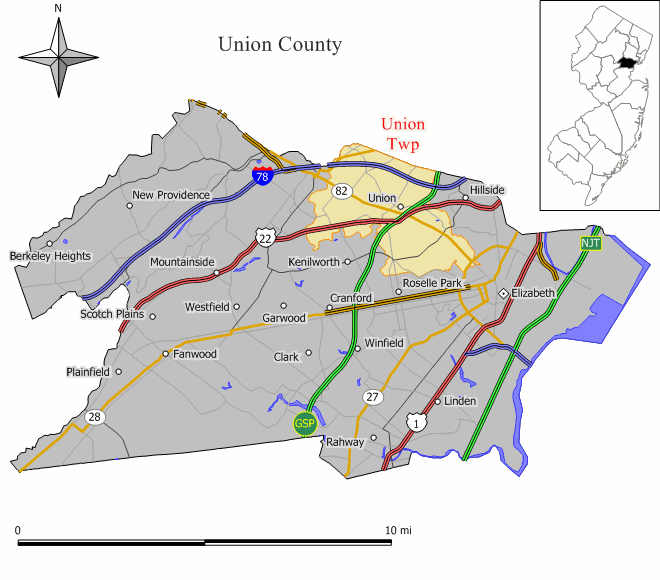
- Location of Union Township in Union County highlighted in yellow (left). Inset map: Location of Union County in New Jersey highlighted in black (right).

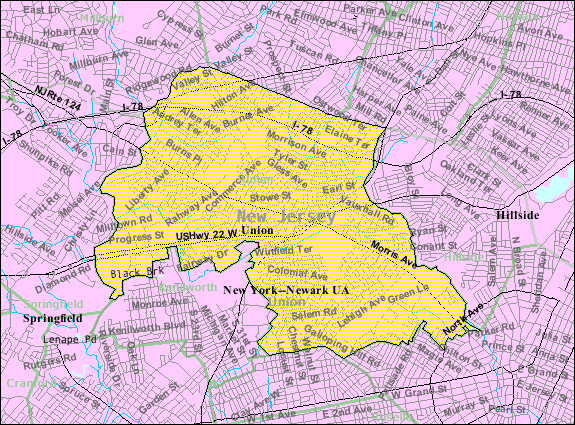
- Census Bureau map of Union Township, Union County, New Jersey

- Location in Union County Location in New Jersey Location in the United States
- Coordinates: 40.695266°N 74.269078°W
- Country: United States
- State: New Jersey
- County: Union
- Incorporated: November 23, 1808

Government
  - Type: Township
  - Body: Township Committee
  - Mayor: Patricia Guerra-Frazier (D, term ends December 31, 2026)
  - Administrator: Donald J. Travisano
  - Municipal clerk: Eileen Birch

Area
  - Total: 9.08 sq mi (23.52 km^{2})
  - Land: 9.05 sq mi (23.44 km^{2})
  - Water: 0.031 sq mi (0.08 km^{2}) 0.35%
  - Rank: 219th of 565 in state 3rd of 21 in county
- Elevation: 125 ft (38 m)

Population (2020)
  - Total: 59,728
  - Estimate (2024): 63,171 ▲
  - Rank: 28th of 565 in state 2nd of 21 in county
  - Density: 6,599/sq mi (2,548/km^{2})
  - Rank: 76th of 565 in state 9th of 21 in county
- Time zone: UTC−05:00 (Eastern (EST))
  - Summer (DST): UTC−04:00 (Eastern (EDT))
- ZIP Codes: 07083: Union; 07088: Vauxhall
- Area code: 908
- FIPS code: 3403974480
- GNIS feature ID: 0882212
- Website: uniontownship.com

Union Township is a township in Union County, in the U.S. state of New Jersey. In the 18th century, the area that is now Union was then called Connecticut Farms. As of the 2020 United States census, the township's population was 59,728, its highest decennial census count ever and an increase of 3,086 (+5.4%) from the 2010 census count of 56,642, which in turn had reflected an increase of 2,237 (+4.1%) from the 54,405 counted at the 2000 census.

== History ==
Settled in 1667, Union was the third English speaking settlement in New Jersey after Elizabeth and Newark, with the area that is now Union then called Connecticut Farms.

Union Township was the site of the Battle of Connecticut Farms. On June 6, 1780, British troops, led by Hessian General Wilhelm von Knyphausen, boarded boats on Staten Island bound for Elizabeth, New Jersey. At midnight, 5,000 troops started to land. They expected the Continental Army to give little resistance, believing that they were tired of the war and were poorly fed and paid. They also expected the citizens of New Jersey to welcome them. They were wrong on both counts and were unable to make their way to and through the Hobart Gap.

Union Township was incorporated as a township by an act of the New Jersey Legislature on November 23, 1808, from portions of Elizabeth Township, while the area was still part of Essex County. It became part of the newly formed Union County on March 19, 1857. Portions of the township have been taken to form Linden Township (March 4, 1861), Roselle Park, (March 22, 1901), Kenilworth (May 13, 1907) and Hillside (April 3, 1913). In 1946, a group of residents pushed for the township's name to be changed to "Connecticut Farms", citing the potential benefits to area residents and businesses from the broad awareness of the historical significance of the name.

The Self-Master Colony was a private experiment in housing the homeless; built on the Hoyt family mansion in Union Township in 1908. The colony was founded by Andress Small Floyd and his wife Lillian, lasting until 1938.

== Geography ==
The Township of Union is located on the northern edge of Union County and is bordered by eight municipalities: Hillside to the east, Elizabeth to the southeast, Roselle Park and Kenilworth to the south and Springfield Township to the west. Northwest of the township lies Millburn, to the north lies Maplewood and to the northeast lies Irvington, all in Essex County.

According to the United States Census Bureau, the township had a total area of 9.08 square miles (23.52 km^{2}), including 9.05 square miles (23.44 km^{2}) of land and 0.03 square miles (0.08 km^{2}) of water (0.35%).

Unincorporated communities, localities and place names located partially or completely within the township include Battle Hill, Connecticut Farms, Galloping Hill, Headlentown, Putnam Manor, Salem, Townley, Union CDP, and Vauxhall.

=== Neighborhoods ===
- Five Points, area around the junction of Galloping Hill Road, Chestnut Street, Salem Road, Delaware Avenue, Walton Avenue, and Tucker Avenue.
- Brookside Heights (Curryville), west of Vauxhall Road.
- Vauxhall, area of Union north of I-78 and west of Stuyvesant Avenue, with its own ZIP code 07088.
- Union Center, area around the intersection of Morris and Stuyvesant Avenues.
- Putnam Ridge, a section between Suburban Road, Morris Avenue, Twin Oaks Road, and Colonial Avenue.
- Putnam Manor, an historic section between Colonial Avenue and Salem Road.
- Orchard Park
- Parkside Manor, a three-road section off of Union Terrace.
- Larchmont Estates, area bordered by Larchmont Reservation (NW and NE edges), Morris Avenue (SW), Liberty Avenue (SE), and Joe Collins Park/Larchmont Reservation (NE edge).
- Battle Hill, area served by Battle Hill Elementary School in west Union, bordered by Rahway River (W edge), Morris Avenue (N), the west branch of the Elizabeth River (E), and Route 22 (S).
- Green Lane, new community between Kean University and Union Station.
- Fairway Drive, community bordering the Galloping Hill Golf Course.
- Rich Creek, the neighborhood of Richard Terrace

== Demographics ==
Historical population
Census	Pop.	Note	%±
1810	1,428		—
1820	1,567		9.7%
1830	1,409		−10.1%
1840	1,482		5.2%
1850	1,662		12.1%
1860	1,812		9.0%
1870	2,314	*	27.7%
1880	2,418		4.5%
1890	2,846		17.7%
1900	4,315		51.6%
1910	3,419	*	−20.8%
1920	3,962	*	15.9%
1930	16,472		315.7%
1940	24,730		50.1%
1950	38,004		53.7%
1960	51,499		35.5%
1970	53,077		3.1%
1980	50,184		−5.5%
1990	50,024		−0.3%
2000	54,405		8.8%
2010	56,642		4.1%
2020	59,728		5.4%
2024 (est.)	63,171		5.8%
Population sources: 1810–1920 1840; 1850–1870 1850 1870; 1880–1890 1890–1910 1910–1930; 1940–2000 2000; 2010 2020 * = Lost territory in previous decade.

=== 2020 census ===
Union Township, Union County, New Jersey – Racial and ethnic composition Note: the US Census treats Hispanic/Latino as an ethnic category. This table excludes Latinos from the racial categories and assigns them to a separate category. Hispanics/Latinos may be of any race.
Race / Ethnicity (NH = Non-Hispanic)	Pop 1990	Pop 2000	Pop 2010	Pop 2020	% 1990	% 2000	% 2010	% 2020
White alone (NH)	41,466	33,661	24,973	19,146	82.89%	61.87%	44.09%	32.06%
Black or African American alone (NH)	4,607	10,563	15,979	19,296	9.21%	19.42%	28.21%	32.31%
Native American or Alaska Native alone (NH)	49	65	44	68	0.10%	0.12%	0.08%	0.11%
Asian alone (NH)	1,629	4,191	5,959	6,472	3.26%	7.70%	10.52%	10.84%
Native Hawaiian or Pacific Islander alone (NH)	N/A	9	20	13	N/A	0.02%	0.04%	0.02%
Other race alone (NH)	34	107	333	766	0.07%	0.20%	0.59%	1.28%
Mixed race or Multiracial (NH)	N/A	948	869	2,068	N/A	1.74%	1.53%	3.46%
Hispanic or Latino (any race)	2,239	4,861	8,465	11,899	4.48%	8.93%	14.94%	19.92%
Total	50,024	54,405	56,642	59,728	100.00%	100.00%	100.00%	100.00%

=== 2010 census ===
The 2010 United States census counted 56,642 people, 19,556 households, and 14,276 families in the township. The population density was 6,244.3 per square mile (2,410.9/km^{2}). There were 20,250 housing units at an average density of 2,232.4 per square mile (861.9/km^{2}). The racial makeup was 53.78% (30,464) White, 28.98% (16,417) Black or African American, 0.14% (80) Native American, 10.60% (6,003) Asian, 0.04% (24) Pacific Islander, 4.06% (2,297) from other races, and 2.40% (1,357) from two or more races. Hispanic or Latino of any race were 14.94% (8,465) of the population.

Of the 19,556 households, 31.6% had children under the age of 18; 53.7% were married couples living together; 14.4% had a female householder with no husband present and 27.0% were non-families. Of all households, 23.0% were made up of individuals and 10.8% had someone living alone who was 65 years of age or older. The average household size was 2.82 and the average family size was 3.35.

21.1% of the population were under the age of 18, 10.7% from 18 to 24, 26.0% from 25 to 44, 28.2% from 45 to 64, and 14.0% who were 65 years of age or older. The median age was 39.6 years. For every 100 females, the population had 89.7 males. For every 100 females ages 18 and older there were 85.6 males.

The Census Bureau's 2006–2010 American Community Survey showed that (in 2010 inflation-adjusted dollars) median household income was $73,722 (with a margin of error of +/− $4,858) and the median family income was $86,705 (+/− $3,822). Males had a median income of $54,811 (+/− $1,998) versus $47,144 (+/− $2,316) for females. The per capita income for the township was $31,135 (+/− $1,104). About 3.7% of families and 4.7% of the population were below the poverty line, including 4.7% of those under age 18 and 5.6% of those age 65 or over.

=== 2000 census ===
The 2000 United States census counted 54,405 people, 19,534 households, and 14,162 families residing in the township. The population density was 5,968.1 inhabitants per square mile (2,304.3/km^{2}). There were 20,001 housing units at an average density of 2,194.1 per square mile (847.1/km^{2}). An example of a diverse municipality in the United States, the racial makeup of the township was 67.66% White, 19.76% African American, 0.15% Native American, 7.72% Asian, 0.02% Pacific Islander, 2.44% from other races, and 2.24% from two or more races. Hispanic or Latino of any race were 8.93% of the population.

There were 19,534 households, out of which 32.0% had children under the age of 18 living with them, 55.5% were married couples living together, 13.1% had a female householder with no husband present, and 27.5% were non-families. 23.8% of all households were made up of individuals, and 13.3% had someone living alone who was 65 years of age or older. The average household size was 2.71 and the average family size was 3.25.

In the township the population was spread out, with 22.3% under the age of 18, 8.9% from 18 to 24, 29.3% from 25 to 44, 22.3% from 45 to 64, and 17.3% who were 65 years of age or older. The median age was 39 years. For every 100 females, there were 87.9 males. For every 100 females age 18 and over, there were 83.2 males.

The median income for a household in the township was $59,173, and the median income for a family was $68,707. Males had a median income of $45,299 versus $35,604 for females. The per capita income for the township was $24,768. About 3.0% of families and 4.2% of the population were below the poverty line, including 4.6% of those under age 18 and 5.5% of those age 65 or over.

== Government ==
=== Local government ===
Union Township is governed under the Township form of New Jersey municipal government, one of 141 municipalities (of the 564) statewide that use this form, the second-most commonly used form of government in the state. The Township Committee is comprised of five members, who are elected directly by the voters at-large in partisan elections to serve three-year terms of office on a staggered basis, with either one or two seats coming up for election each year as part of the November general election in a three-year cycle. At an annual reorganization meeting, the Township Committee selects one of its members to serve as Mayor. The Mayor, in addition to voting as a member of the Township Committee, presides over the meetings of the committee and carries out ceremonial duties.

As of 2026, members of the Union Township Committee are Mayor Patricia Guerra-Frazier (D, term on committee ends December 31, 2028; term as mayor ends 2026), Deputy Mayor Joseph Florio (D, term on committee ends December 31, 2026; term as deputy mayor ends 2026), James Bowser, Jr. (D, 2028), Manuel T. Figueiredo (D, 2027), and Sandra Terrell (D, 2027).

On March 26, 2024, Sandra Terrell was appointed to the Township Committee to fill the seat held by James Louis, who resigned on March 13 for personal reasons. Louis had been appointed on December 5, 2023 to fill the seat held by Michele Delisfort, who resigned on November 21 following her election as Union County commissioner.

On December 19, 2023, Patricia Guerra-Frazier was appointed to the Township Committee to fill the seat held by Suzette Cavadas, who resigned on December 12 for personal reasons.

==== Mayors of Union ====
#	Mayor	Years in Office	Party	Terms	Notes
1	John Leonard	1879–1883		1–4	First term
2	James A. Burnett	1884–1885		5–6	
3	John Leonard	1886		7	Second term
4	James B. Woodruff	1887–1891		8–12	Five consecutive terms
5	John Tunison	1892–1893		13–14	Two consecutive terms
6	Daniel H. Beach	1894–1895		15–16	Two consecutive terms
7	William P. Bonnell	1896		17	
8	John H. Doremus	1897		18	First term
9	Daniel H. Beach	1898		19	Third term
10	William A. Bainbridge	1899		20	
11	John H. Doremus	1900		21	Second term
12	Daniel H. Beach	1901		22	Fourth term
13	John H. Doremus	1902–1903		23–24	Third and fourth terms
14	Walter A. Miller	1904–1905		25–26	Two consecutive terms
15	Daniel B. Wade	1906		25	First term
16	John H. Doremus	1907		26	Fourth term
17	Daniel H. Beach	1908		27	
18	Daniel B. Wade	1909		28	
19	Gottlieb Schnabel	1910		29	
20	Daniel H. Beach	1911		30	
21	Howard B. Kline	1912		31	
22	Gottlieb Schnabel	1913		32	
22	Daniel H. Beach	1914		33	
23	Cornelius E. Blanchard	1915		34	
24	George A. Bashford	1916		35	
25	Daniel H. Beach	1917		36	
26	Harry Schmitt	1918		37	
27	George A. Bashford	1919		38	
28	Daniel H. Beach	1920–1921		39–40	Two consecutive terms
29	George A. Bashford	1922		41	
30	Ambrose B. Kline	1923		42	
31	Charles W. Mink	1924–1926		43–45	Three consecutive terms
32	Ambrose B. Kline	1927–1928		46–47	Two consecutive terms
33	Gustav Hummel Jr.	1929–1931		48–50	Three consecutive terms
34	Max A. Schoenwalder	1932–1933		51–52	Two consecutive terms
35	Charles Schramm	1934–1939		53–58	Six consecutive terms. Resigned in 1939
36	Fred Edward Biertuempfel	1939–1973	Republican	59–93	Thirty-four consecutive terms.
37	Samuel Rabkin	1973	Republican	93	Finished Biertuempfel's term. Rabkin Field named after him
38	Anthony E. Russo	1974	Democrat	94	
39	James C. Conlon	1975	Republican	95	
40	John S. Zimmerman	1976	Democrat	96	
41	Edward Goodkin	1977	Republican	97	
42	James C. Conlon	1978–1980	Democrat	98–99	Two consecutive terms
43	Edward Weber	1981	Democrat	100	
44	James C. Conlon	1982	Republican	101	
45	Anthony E. Russo	1983–1985	Democrat	102-104	
48	Michael T. Bono	1986	Democrat	105	
49	Diane Heelan	1987	Republican	106	Union's first female mayor
50	Anthony E. Russo	1988–1993	Democrat	107	
56	Jerome Petti	1994	Democrat	113	
57	Greg Muller	1995	Republican	114	
58	Jerome Petti	1996	Democrat	115	
59	Greg Muller	1997	Republican	116	
60	Anthony L. Terrezza	1998–1999	Democrat	117–118	Two consecutive terms
61	Joseph Florio	2000	Democrat	119	
62	Peter A. Capodice	2001	Democrat	120	
63	Patrick Scanlon	2002	Democrat	121	
64	Brenda C. Restivo	2003	Democrat	122	
65	Anthony L. Terrezza	2004	Democrat	123	
66	Joseph Florio	2005	Democrat	124	
67	Peter A. Capodice	2006	Democrat	125	
68	Brenda C. Restivo	2007	Democrat	126	Second term
69	Clifton People Jr.	2008	Democrat	127	Union's first African-American mayor
70	Anthony L. Terrezza	2009–2010	Democrat	128–129	Two consecutive terms
71	Joseph Florio	2011–2012	Democrat	130–131	Two consecutive terms. Second & third terms as mayor
72	Clifton People Jr.	2013–2014	Democrat	132–133	Two consecutive terms. Second & third terms as mayor
73	Manuel T. Figueiredo	2015–2016	Democrat	134–135	Two consecutive terms
74	Suzette Cavadas	2017–2018	Democrat	136	
75	Michèle S. Delisfort	2019–2021	Democrat	137–139	Three consecutive terms
76	Manuel T. Figueiredo	2022–2024	Democrat	140-142	Three consecutive terms
77	James Bowser Jr.	2025	Democrat	143	
78	Patricia Guerra-Frazier	2026–	Democrat	144	

=== Federal, state, and county representation ===
Union Township is in the 10th Congressional Districts and is part of New Jersey's 20th state legislative district.

Prior to the 2010 Census, Union Township had been split between the 7th and 10th Congressional Districts with different boundaries, a change made by the New Jersey Redistricting Commission that took effect in January 2013, based on the results of the November 2012 general elections. The redistricting plan that took effect in 2013 placed 31,611 residents living in the central and western portions of the township into the 7th District, while 25,031 residents in a semicircle that runs along the northern, eastern and southern borders of the township were placed into the 10th District.

For the 119th United States Congress, New Jersey's 10th congressional district is represented by LaMonica McIver (D, Newark). New Jersey is represented in the United States Senate by Democrats Cory Booker (Newark, term ends 2027) and Andy Kim (Moorestown, term ends 2031).

For the 2026–2027 session, the 20th legislative district of the New Jersey Legislature is represented in the State Senate by Joseph Cryan (D, Union Township) and in the General Assembly by Annette Quijano (D, Elizabeth) and Ed Rodriguez (D, Elizabeth).

Union County is governed by a Board of County Commissioners, whose nine members are elected at-large to three-year terms of office on a staggered basis with three seats coming up for election each year, with an appointed County Manager overseeing the day-to-day operations of the county. At an annual reorganization meeting held in the beginning of January, the board selects a Chair and Vice Chair from among its members. As of 2026, Union County's County Commissioners are:

Vice Chair Rebecca Williams (D, Plainfield, 2028), Chairman Joesph Bodek (D, Linden, 2026), James E. Baker Jr. (D, Rahway, 2027), Michele Delisfort (D, Union Township, 2026), Lourdes M. Leon (D, Elizabeth, 2026), Alexander Mirabella (D, Fanwood, 2027) Kimberly Palmieri-Mouded (D, Westfield, 2027). Stanley J. Neron (D, Elizabeth, 2028), Joseph Signorello III (D, Roselle Park, 2028)

Constitutional officers elected on a countywide basis are: Clerk Vacant - Incumbent Clerk Joanne Rajoppi (D, Union Township) died on July 16, 2026. Her death triggered a special election for a full five-year term to be held concurrently with the November 2026 general election. Deputy Clerk Clara Fernández assumes the powers of the office until the vacancy is filled. Sheriff Peter Corvelli (D, Kenilworth, 2026) and Surrogate Christopher E. Hudak (D, Clark, 2027).

=== Politics ===
As of March 2011, there were a total of 31,155 registered voters in Union Township, of which 12,061 (38.7% vs. 41.8% countywide) were registered as Democrats, 3,928 (12.6% vs. 15.3%) were registered as Republicans and 15,157 (48.7% vs. 42.9%) were registered as Unaffiliated. There were 9 voters registered to other parties. Among the township's 2010 Census population, 55.0% (vs. 53.3% in Union County) were registered to vote, including 69.7% of those ages 18 and over (vs. 70.6% countywide).

United States presidential election results for Union
Year	Republican		Democratic		Third party(ies)	
Year	No.	%	No.	%	No.	%
2024	9,029	31.78%	18,820	66.24%	563	1.98%
2020	8,314	28.09%	21,027	71.05%	255	0.86%
2016	6,999	27.95%	17,401	69.50%	637	2.54%
2012	6,464	28.05%	16,423	71.27%	155	0.67%
2008	8,462	34.86%	15,625	64.36%	189	0.78%
2004	8,987	41.01%	12,751	58.19%	174	0.79%

In the 2012 presidential election, Democrat Barack Obama received 16,423 votes (70.7% vs. 66.0% countywide), ahead of Republican Mitt Romney with 6,464 votes (27.8% vs. 32.3%) and other candidates with 155 votes (0.7% vs. 0.8%), among the 23,235 ballots cast by the township's 33,589 registered voters, for a turnout of 69.2% (vs. 68.8% in Union County). In the 2008 presidential election, Democrat Barack Obama received 15,625 votes (63.8% vs. 63.1% countywide), ahead of Republican John McCain with 8,462 votes (34.5% vs. 35.2%) and other candidates with 189 votes (0.8% vs. 0.9%), among the 24,505 ballots cast by the township's 32,622 registered voters, for a turnout of 75.1% (vs. 74.7% in Union County). In the 2004 presidential election, Democrat John Kerry received 12,751 votes (57.9% vs. 58.3% countywide), ahead of Republican George W. Bush with 8,987 votes (40.8% vs. 40.3%) and other candidates with 174 votes (0.8% vs. 0.7%), among the 22,013 ballots cast by the township's 30,383 registered voters, for a turnout of 72.5% (vs. 72.3% in the whole county).

Gubernatorial election results for Union Township
Year	Republican		Democratic		Third party(ies)	
Year	No.	%	No.	%	No.	%
2025	5,467	24.99%	16,264	74.36%	142	0.65%
2021	4,474	30.81%	9,932	68.41%	113	0.78%
2017	3,309	25.85%	9,190	71.79%	302	2.36%
2013	5,334	45.44%	6,269	53.41%	135	1.15%
2009	5,734	40.33%	7,628	53.66%	854	6.01%
2005	5,041	36.68%	8,335	60.65%	366	2.66%

In the 2017 gubernatorial election, Democrat Phil Murphy received 9,190 votes (71.8% vs. 65.2% countywide), ahead of Republican Kim Guadagno with 3,309 votes (25.8% vs. 32.6%), and other candidates with 302 votes (2.4% vs. 2.1%), among the 13,119 ballots cast by the township's 36,358 registered voters, for a turnout of 36.1%. In the 2013 gubernatorial election, Democrat Barbara Buono received 53.4% of the vote (6,269 cast), ahead of Republican Chris Christie with 45.4% (5,334 votes), and other candidates with 1.2% (135 votes), among the 12,013 ballots cast by the township's 33,305 registered voters (275 ballots were spoiled), for a turnout of 36.1%. In the 2009 gubernatorial election, Democrat Jon Corzine received 7,628 ballots cast (53.0% vs. 50.6% countywide), ahead of Republican Chris Christie with 5,734 votes (39.8% vs. 41.7%), Independent Chris Daggett with 741 votes (5.1% vs. 5.9%) and other candidates with 113 votes (0.8% vs. 0.8%), among the 14,397 ballots cast by the township's 31,972 registered voters, yielding a 45.0% turnout (vs. 46.5% in the county).

United States Senate election results for Union Township1
Year	Republican		Democratic		Third party(ies)	
Year	No.	%	No.	%	No.	%
2024	7,541	28.90%	17,932	68.72%	622	2.38%
2018	4,950	25.84%	13,146	68.63%	1,060	5.53%
2012	5,413	26.19%	14,941	72.28%	316	1.53%
2006	5,049	38.94%	7,635	58.88%	282	2.17%

United States Senate election results for Union Township2
Year	Republican		Democratic		Third party(ies)	
Year	No.	%	No.	%	No.	%
2020	7,651	26.40%	20,888	72.07%	444	1.53%
2014	2,889	27.49%	7,455	70.94%	165	1.57%
2013	2,616	32.32%	5,406	66.80%	71	0.88%
2008	6,753	33.54%	12,953	64.33%	430	2.14%

== Education ==
The Union Public School District serves students in pre-kindergarten through twelfth grade. The schools in the district (with 2021–22 enrollment data from the National Center for Education Statistics) are Battle Hill Elementary School (379 students; in grades PreK-4), Hannah Caldwell Elementary School (646; PreK-4), Connecticut Farms Elementary School (382; PreK-4), Franklin Elementary School (468; PreK-4), Livingston Elementary School (420; PreK-4), Washington Elementary School (558; PreK-4), Jefferson Elementary School (524; grade 5), Burnet Middle School (977; 6–8), Kawameeh Middle School (728; 6–8) and Union High School (2,270; 9–12).

Union was threatened with being the first municipality north of the Mason–Dixon line to suffer from penalties as a result of school segregation. The area of Vauxhall was primarily black and the students enrolled at Jefferson Elementary School were disproportionately black, compared to the rest of the township. Union avoided problems by converting Jefferson Elementary into a sixth-grade only school called Central 6 and bused the Jefferson students to all the other elementary schools. It was later renamed Central 5 and is now Jefferson School, which is used as a one-year school for fifth-grade students.

Union is home to several private nursery schools and the Deron School, a private school for learning disabled students ages 5–13. St. Michael's Parish School and Holy Spirit School (founded in 1965) operate under the supervision of the Roman Catholic Archdiocese of Newark.

Kean University, dating back to 1855, serves a total student population of almost 16,000. Called New Jersey State Teachers College when it was located in Newark, the school moved to Union in 1958, was renamed Kean College in 1973 and was granted university status in 1997.

== Transportation ==
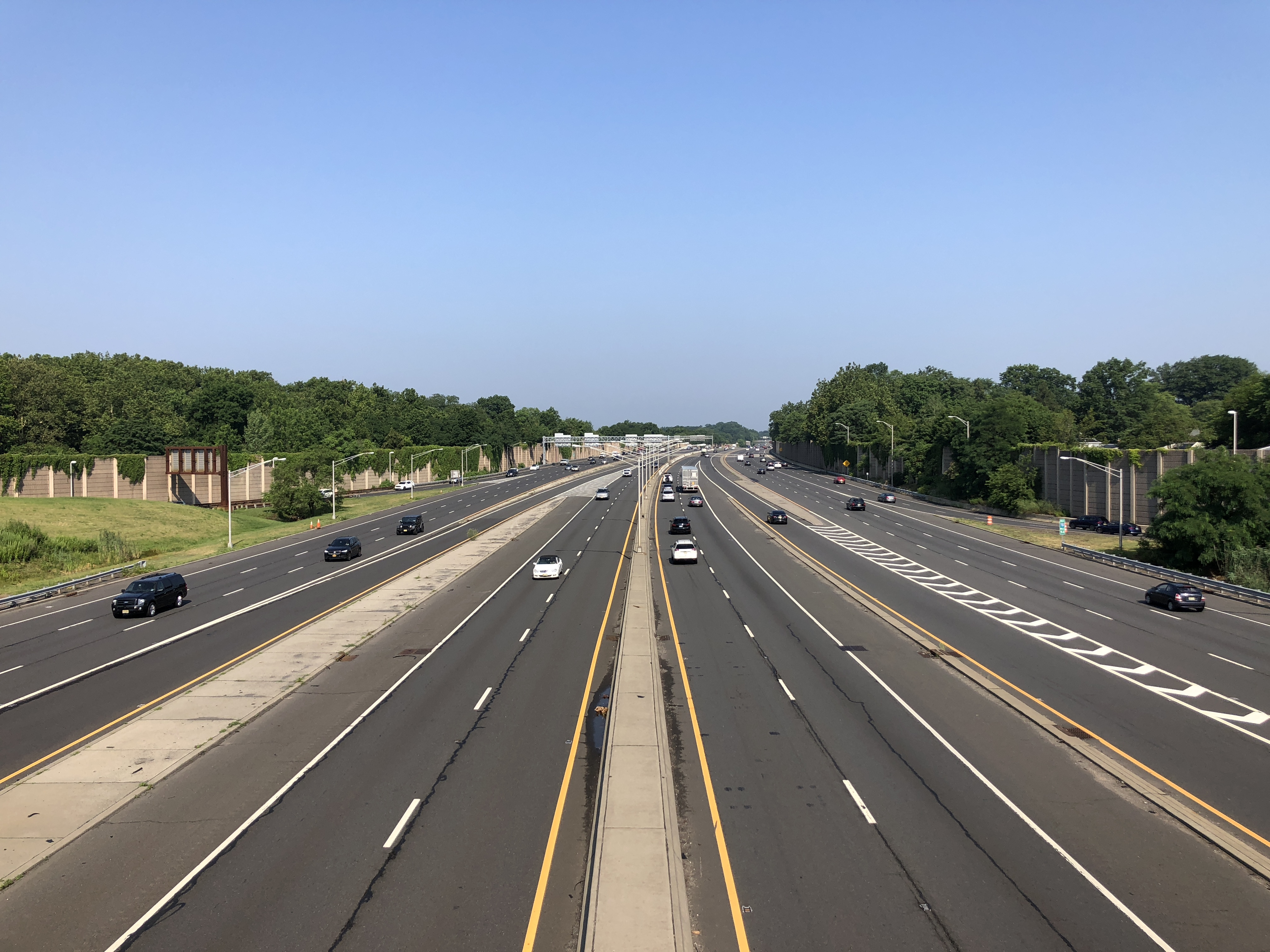
Interstate 78 westbound in Union

=== Roads and highways ===
As of May 2010, the township had a total of 145.85 miles (234.72 km) of roadways, of which 120.11 miles (193.30 km) were maintained by the municipality, 11.43 miles (18.39 km) by Union County and 12.46 miles (20.05 km) by the New Jersey Department of Transportation and 1.85 miles (2.98 km) by the New Jersey Turnpike Authority.

Union is traversed by the Garden State Parkway, Interstate 78, U.S. Route 22 and Route 82 (Morris Avenue).

The Parkway connects Kenilworth in the south to Hillside in the north. The Parkway includes interchanges 139A (Chestnut Street) / 139B (Route 82 West Union), interchanges 140 (Route 22 / Route 82 west) / 140A (Route 22 / Route 82 west) and interchange 141 (Vauxhall Road / Union).

=== Public transportation ===
NJ Transit offers rail service at the Union train station providing service on the Raritan Valley Line, formerly the mainline of the Lehigh Valley Railroad, to Newark Penn Station. The station opened in 2003 and includes a parking lot with over 450 spaces.

NJ Transit also provides bus service to New York City and New Jersey points on the 113, 114 and 117 routes to the Port Authority Bus Terminal in Midtown Manhattan, on the 65, 66, 70, and 94 routes to Newark and local service on the 26 and 52.

Former Rahway Valley Railroad freight line, now abandoned, crosses through Union. This line, presently leased to Morristown and Erie Railway, is in the process of revitalization after which it will link to NJ Transit's Morris and Essex Lines at Summit and connect to Staten Island.

Newark Liberty International Airport is located 6 miles (9.7 km) east of Union.

== Notable buildings ==
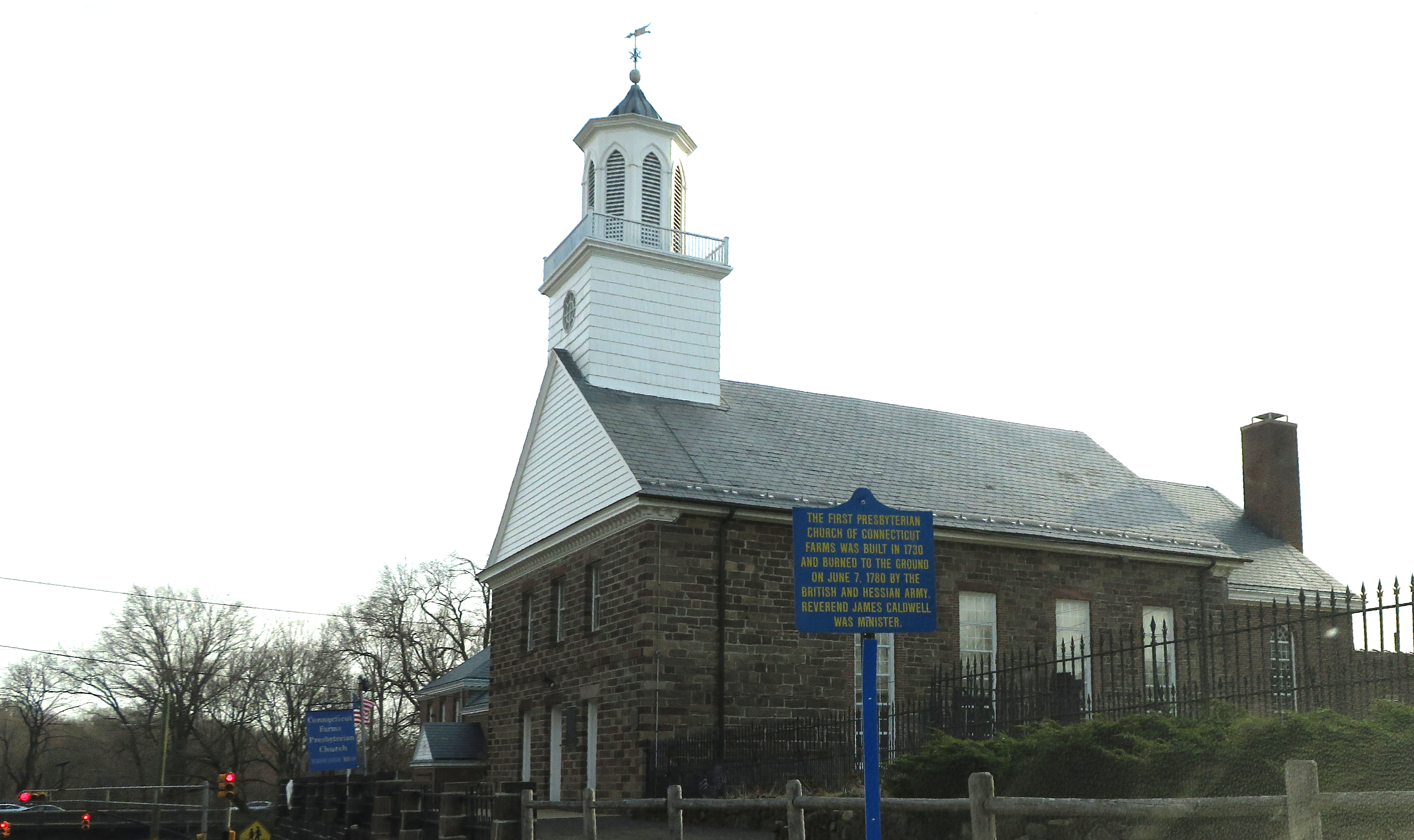
Connecticut Farms Presbyterian Church

- Connecticut Farms Presbyterian Church, historic church dating back to 1730, first church in New Jersey to be listed as a Historic Place.
- The Union Watersphere, for many years the tallest water tower of its type in the world, stands 212 feet tall, holds 250,000 gallons of drinking water and is now also used as a cell phone tower. The landmark and icon inspired a former Union resident to create a website and museum (in Austin, Texas) dedicated to it. In 2025, New Jersey American Water announced that it was planning to demolish the watersphere, which operated from 1964 until the 1980s, when it was taken out of service.
- Union is home to several houses constructed totally of poured concrete, an experiment of Thomas Edison. The homes on Ingersoll Terrace include poured concrete interior walls with formed concrete plumbing.
- Union is home to a building in the shape of a ship at 2262 U.S. Route 22. Originally a restaurant and night club, it has changed ownership over the years, becoming a furniture store known as "The Flagship" and later The Wiz Home Electronics. It is currently a P. C. Richard & Son store.
- Union is home to The Home Depot Superstore, that at 217,000 square feet (20,200 m^{2}) was the chain's largest store in the world as of 2012.

== Notable people ==
People who were born in, residents of, or otherwise closely associated with Union Township include:

- Aminat Ayinde, the second runner-up from Cycle 12 of America's Next Top Model
- C. Louis Bassano (born 1942), politician who served in both the New Jersey General Assembly and the New Jersey Senate
- Isaiah Briscoe (born 1996), basketball player for the Kentucky Wildcats men's basketball team
- Mark Casale (born 1962), former professional football quarterback who played one season with the Toronto Argonauts of the Canadian Football League
- George Chapla, retired soccer defender who played in the North American Soccer League and the American Soccer League
- Nija Charles (born 1997), singer, songwriter and record producer, known by her stage name Amnija
- Freddie 'Red' Cochrane (1915–1993), professional boxer in the welterweight (147lb) division who became World Champion in 1941 in that class
- Tim Coleman (born 1995), professional basketball player
- Joe Collins (1922–1989), first baseman for the New York Yankees from 1948 to 1957 A park on Liberty Avenue is named after him.
- Tom Coyne (1954–2017), mastering engineer
- Jonathan Townley Crane (1819–1880), clergyman, author and abolitionist
- Joseph Cryan (born 1961), represents the 20th legislative district in the New Jersey General Assembly
- Quenton DeCosey (born 1994), professional basketball player for Koroivos of the Greek Basket League
- Jamie Fox (1954–2017), political strategist
- Ralph Froehlich (1930–2014), sheriff of Union County who served for 37 years, making him the longest-serving sheriff in New Jersey history
- Gina Genovese (born 1959), businesswoman and politician who has served as mayor of Long Hill Township
- Kayla Hoffman (born 1988), artistic gymnast
- Mildred Barry Hughes (1902–1995), the first woman elected to the New Jersey Senate, in 1965
- Davison Igbinosun (born 2004), American football cornerback for the Ohio State Buckeyes
- Ron Karkovice (born 1963), Major League baseball catcher from 1986 to 1997
- John Kean (1814–1895), businessman and public official
- Vincent Kearney, politician who has been a Garwood councilmember and is representative-elect of the New Jersey General Assembly's 21st district
- Amalya Kearse (born 1937), a judge of the United States Court of Appeals for the Second Circuit
- Myra Smith Kearse (1899–1982), physician and community leader
- Wan J. Kim (born 1968), attorney and former government official
- Larry Kubin (born 1959), linebacker who played with the Washington Redskins from 1981 to 1984
- Kelly Kulick (born 1977), professional bowler who became the first woman ever to win a regular Professional Bowlers Association tour title
- Artie Lange (born 1967), comedian, actor, and former Howard Stern Show sidekick
- Ray Liotta (1954–2022), actor, whose films included Goodfellas and Field of Dreams
- Ed Lucas (1939–2021), blind sportswriter who primarily covered the New York Yankees
- Elliott Maddox (born 1947), professional baseball player with both the New York Yankees 1974–1976 and the New York Mets 1978–1980
- Conde McGinley (born 1890), publisher of the anti-Communist and anti-Semitic weekly paper, Common Sense
- Bob Mischak (1932–2014), American football guard and tight end who played in the American Football League and the NFL
- Eulace Peacock (1914–1996), track and field athlete in the 1930s who was a top competitor of Jesse Owens
- Matthew John Rinaldo (1931–2008), represented New Jersey in the United States House of Representatives for twenty years, in the 12th congressional district (1973–1983) and in the 7th congressional district (1983–1993)
- Tyler Roberson (born 1994), professional basketball player for the Agua Caliente Clippers of the NBA G League
- Lawrence E. Roberts (1922–2004), pilot with the Tuskegee Airmen and a colonel in the United States Air Force
- Philip Rubin (born 1949), cognitive scientist, technologist and science administrator
- Anthony E. Russo (born 1926), former member of the New Jersey Senate who served as Mayor of Union
- Karl Schellscheidt (born 1968), soccer player, educator and entrepreneur
- Manfred Schellscheidt (born 1941), German-American soccer coach and former player and member of the National Soccer Hall of Fame
- Linda Simensky, business executive who served as a creative executive for Nickelodeon and Cartoon Network
- Amy Simon (born 1971), planetary scientist at NASA's Goddard Space Flight Center
- Darnell Stapleton (born 1985), former offensive guard for the Pittsburgh Steelers who was a member of the Steelers' Super Bowl XLIII championship team
- Travis Taylor (born 1990), professional basketball player
- Bill Wenzel (1918–1987), cartoonist best known for his good girl art
- Robert Wuhl (born 1951), actor
- Darren Young (born 1983), professional wrestler formerly signed to WWE where he is one half of The Prime Time Players with Titus O'Neil
