= Roselle, New Jersey =

Borough in Union County, New Jersey, US

- Borough
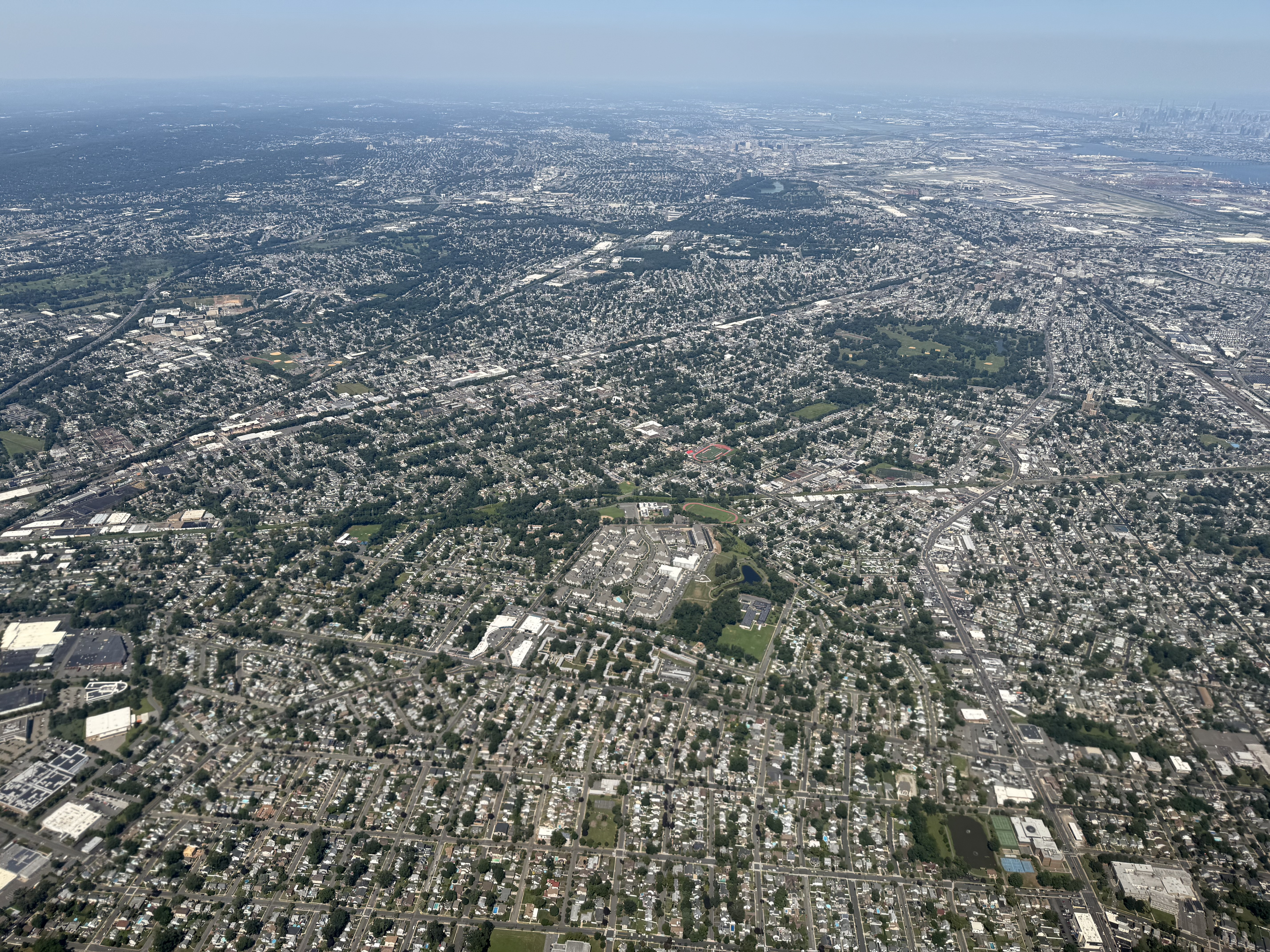
- Aerial view of Roselle (center of image) and surrounding towns

- Seal

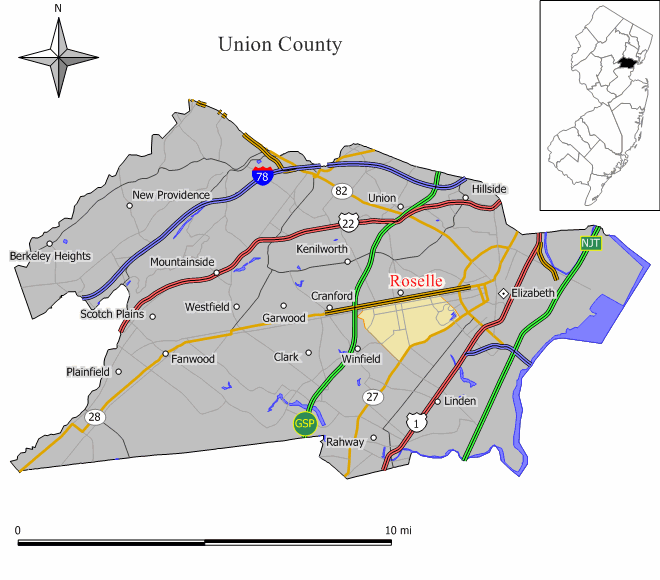
- Map of Roselle in Union County. Inset: Location of Union County in New Jersey

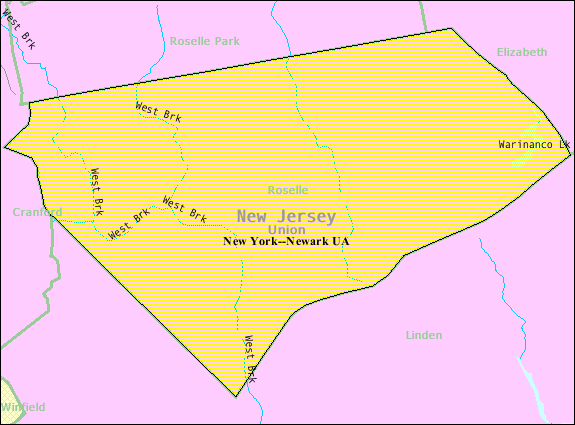
- Census Bureau map of Roselle, New Jersey
- Interactive map of Roselle, New Jersey
- Location in Union County Location in New Jersey Location in the United States
- Coordinates: 40.652211°N 74.260158°W
- Country: United States
- State: New Jersey
- County: Union
- Incorporated: December 20, 1894

Government
  - Type: Borough
  - Body: Borough Council
  - Mayor: Donald A. Shaw (D, term ends December 31, 2027)
  - Administrator: Christopher Laba (acting)
  - Municipal clerk: Lisette Sanchez

Area
  - Total: 2.65 sq mi (6.86 km^{2})
  - Land: 2.63 sq mi (6.82 km^{2})
  - Water: 0.012 sq mi (0.03 km^{2}) 0.49%
  - Rank: 366th of 565 in state 16th of 21 in county
- Elevation: 56 ft (17 m)

Population (2020)
  - Total: 22,695
  - Estimate (2023): 22,342
  - Rank: 120th of 565 in state 10th of 21 in county
  - Density: 8,612.9/sq mi (3,325.5/km^{2})
  - Rank: 45th of 565 in state 4th of 21 in county
- Time zone: UTC−05:00 (Eastern (EST))
  - Summer (DST): UTC−04:00 (Eastern (EDT))
- ZIP Code: 07203
- Area code: 908
- FIPS code: 3403964620
- GNIS feature ID: 0885379
- Website: www.boroughofroselle.com

Roselle (/roʊˈzɛl/ row-ZELL) is a borough located in Union County in the U.S. state of New Jersey. As of the 2020 United States census, the borough's population was 22,695, an increase of 1,610 (+7.6%) from the 2010 census count of 21,085, which in turn reflected a decline of 189 (−0.9%) from the 21,274 counted in the 2000 census. The Population Estimates Program calculated a population of 22,342 in 2023, a decrease of 353 (−1.6%).

== History ==
On January 19, 1883, the world's first electric lighting system employing overhead wires began service in Roselle. It had been built by Thomas Edison to demonstrate that an entire community could be illuminated by electricity. This success encouraged the installation of electric lighting in numerous other villages and cities. The First Presbyterian Church, located on the corner of West 5th Avenue and Chestnut Street, was the first church in the United States to be lit by electricity, and the second in the world after the City Temple church in London.

Roselle was incorporated on December 20, 1894, at the height of the Boroughitis phenomenon sweeping through New Jersey at the time, based on the results of a referendum held two days earlier, from portions of Linden. Roselle's name is derived from the Roselle Land Improvement Company, which was created in 1866 to lay out a community around the Mulford Station on the Central Railroad of New Jersey. The name "Roselle" is said to have been based on the company's founder, John Conklin Rose or from John Pierre Roselle, a friend of the railroad's president.

== Geography ==
According to the United States Census Bureau, the borough had a total area of 2.65 square miles (6.86 km^{2}), including 2.64 square miles (6.82 km^{2}) of land and 0.01 square miles (0.03 km^{2}) of water (0.49%).

Unincorporated communities, localities and place names located partially or completely within the borough include Aldene.

The borough is bordered by the Union County municipalities of Roselle Park to the north, Linden to the south and Cranford to the west and Elizabeth, along the edges of Warinanco Park, to the east. Morses Creek runs through the borough.

== Demographics ==
Historical population
Census	Pop.	Note	%±
1880	737		—
1890	996		35.1%
1900	1,652		65.9%
1910	2,725		65.0%
1920	5,737		110.5%
1930	13,021		127.0%
1940	13,597		4.4%
1950	17,681		30.0%
1960	21,032		19.0%
1970	22,585		7.4%
1980	20,641		−8.6%
1990	20,314		−1.6%
2000	21,274		4.7%
2010	21,085		−0.9%
2020	22,695		7.6%
2023 (est.)	22,342	▼	−1.6%
Population sources: 1880–1890; 1890–1920 1890–1910; 1900–1920 1910–1930 1940–2000; 2000 2010 2020

=== Racial and ethnic composition ===
Roselle borough, New Jersey – Racial and ethnic composition Note: the US Census treats Hispanic/Latino as an ethnic category. This table excludes Latinos from the racial categories and assigns them to a separate category. Hispanics/Latinos may be of any race.
Race / Ethnicity (NH = Non-Hispanic)	Pop 2000	Pop 2010	Pop 2020	% 2000	% 2010	% 2020
White alone (NH)	5,674	3,389	2,474	26.67%	16.07%	10.90%
Black or African American alone (NH)	10,669	11,148	10,800	50.15%	52.87%	47.59%
Native American or Alaska Native alone (NH)	46	25	37	0.22%	0.12%	0.16%
Asian alone (NH)	573	464	580	2.69%	2.20%	2.56%
Pacific Islander alone (NH)	12	0	7	0.06%	0.00%	0.03%
Some Other Race alone (NH)	95	112	222	0.45%	0.53%	0.98%
Mixed Race or Multi-Racial (NH)	564	303	675	2.65%	1.44%	2.97%
Hispanic or Latino (any race)	3,641	5,644	7,900	17.11%	26.77%	34.81%
Total	21,274	21,085	22,695	100.00%	100.00%	100.00%

=== 2020 census ===
As of the 2020 census, Roselle had a population of 22,695. The median age was 38.9 years. 20.8% of residents were under the age of 18 and 14.5% of residents were 65 years of age or older. For every 100 females there were 88.8 males, and for every 100 females age 18 and over there were 85.8 males age 18 and over.

100.0% of residents lived in urban areas, while 0.0% lived in rural areas.

There were 8,008 households in Roselle, of which 34.2% had children under the age of 18 living in them. Of all households, 38.3% were married-couple households, 19.0% were households with a male householder and no spouse or partner present, and 35.3% were households with a female householder and no spouse or partner present. About 26.5% of all households were made up of individuals and 10.0% had someone living alone who was 65 years of age or older.

There were 8,431 housing units, of which 5.0% were vacant. The homeowner vacancy rate was 1.9% and the rental vacancy rate was 4.8%.

=== 2010 census ===
The 2010 United States census counted 21,085 people, 7,407 households, and 5,096 families in the borough. The population density was 7,953.5 per square mile (3,070.9/km^{2}). There were 7,939 housing units at an average density of 2,994.7 per square mile (1,156.3/km^{2}). The racial makeup was 29.59% (6,240) White, 55.06% (11,610) Black or African American, 0.31% (65) Native American, 2.23% (471) Asian, 0.02% (5) Pacific Islander, 9.63% (2,030) from other races, and 3.15% (664) from two or more races. Hispanic or Latino of any race were 26.77% (5,644) of the population.

Of the 7,407 households, 31.1% had children under the age of 18; 42.0% were married couples living together; 19.8% had a female householder with no husband present and 31.2% were non-families. Of all households, 26.7% were made up of individuals and 9.6% had someone living alone who was 65 years of age or older. The average household size was 2.84 and the average family size was 3.44.

23.5% of the population were under the age of 18, 9.5% from 18 to 24, 28.3% from 25 to 44, 26.7% from 45 to 64, and 12.0% who were 65 years of age or older. The median age was 37.0 years. For every 100 females, the population had 90.6 males. For every 100 females ages 18 and older there were 85.6 males.

The Census Bureau's 2006–2010 American Community Survey showed that (in 2010 inflation-adjusted dollars) median household income was $58,041 (with a margin of error of +/− $3,948) and the median family income was $64,038 (+/− $4,495). Males had a median income of $40,163 (+/− $3,874) versus $36,210 (+/− $1,612) for females. The per capita income for the borough was $25,678 (+/− $1,130). About 7.5% of families and 8.2% of the population were below the poverty line, including 13.9% of those under age 18 and 4.6% of those age 65 or over.

=== 2000 census ===
As of the 2000 United States census there were 21,274 people, 7,520 households, and 5,226 families residing in the borough. The population density was 8,048.8 inhabitants per square mile (3,107.7/km^{2}). There were 7,870 housing units at an average density of 2,977.5 per square mile (1,149.6/km^{2}). The racial makeup of the borough was 51.32% African American, 35.58% White, 0.31% Native American, 2.71% Asian, 0.07% Pacific Islander, 6.07% from other races, and 3.93% from two or more races. Hispanic or Latino of any race were 17.11% of the population.

8.0% of the population of Roselle (Creole: Wozel) was of Haitian ancestry. This was the third-highest such percentage in New Jersey and the 16th-highest of any municipality in the nation.

There were 7,520 households, out of which 32.2% had children under the age of 18 living with them, 45.3% were married couples living together, 18.8% had a female householder with no husband present, and 30.5% were non-families. 25.2% of all households were made up of individuals, and 9.9% had someone living alone who was 65 years of age or older. The average household size was 2.82 and the average family size was 3.41.

In the borough the population was spread out, with 25.5% under the age of 18, 9.4% from 18 to 24, 30.8% from 25 to 44, 22.2% from 45 to 64, and 12.0% who were 65 years of age or older. The median age was 35 years. For every 100 females, there were 87.9 males. For every 100 females age 18 and over, there were 82.8 males.

The median income for a household in the borough was $51,254, and the median income for a family was $58,841. Males had a median income of $37,604 versus $32,535 for females. The per capita income for the borough was $21,269. About 5.8% of families and 7.5% of the population were below the poverty line, including 8.5% of those under age 18 and 10.7% of those age 65 or over.

== Economy ==
Portions of the borough are part of an Urban Enterprise Zone (UEZ), one of 32 zones covering 37 municipalities statewide. Roselle was selected in 2002 as one of a group of three zones added to participate in the program. In addition to other benefits to encourage employment and investment within the Zone, shoppers can take advantage of a reduced 3.3125% sales tax rate (half of the 6 5/8% rate charged statewide) at eligible merchants. Established in July 2002, the borough's Urban Enterprise Zone status expires in December 2023.

== Arts and culture ==
The Roselle House Music Festival is held each July in Warinanco Park, sponsored by the borough council, the Union County Board of County Commissioners and commercial brand sponsors.

The annual Roselle House Music Festival celebrates the soulful, gospel-infused subgenre of house music native to the state of New Jersey first developed in the 1980s that is known as the "Jersey sound."

== Parks and recreation ==
Warinanco Park is a Union County park created in 1920 that covers 205 acres (83 ha) in Roselle and Elizabeth.

== Government ==
=== Local government ===
Roselle is governed under the borough form of New Jersey municipal government, which is used in 218 municipalities of the 564 statewide, making it the most common form of government in New Jersey. The governing body is comprised of the mayor and the borough council, with all positions elected on a partisan basis as part of the November general election. The mayor is elected directly by the voters to a four-year term of office. The borough council includes six members elected to serve three-year terms on a staggered basis, with two seats coming up for election each year in a three-year cycle. Roselle is divided into five election districts, referred to as wards. One councilperson is elected from each of the five wards, and one councilperson is elected from the borough at-large. Roselle is one of only two boroughs statewide that use wards (the other is Roselle Park). The borough form of government used by Roselle is a "weak mayor / strong council" government in which council members act as the legislative body with the mayor presiding at meetings and voting only in the event of a tie. The mayor can veto ordinances subject to an override by a two-thirds majority vote of the council. The mayor makes committee and liaison assignments for council members, and most appointments are made by the mayor with the advice and consent of the council. A borough administrator, appointed by the borough council, oversees the day-to-day operations of the municipal government.

As of 2026, the mayor of the Borough of Roselle is Democrat Donald Shaw, whose term of office ends on December 31, 2027. Members of the Roselle Borough Council are Council President Cindy Thomas (Ward 4; D, 2028), Brandon Bernier (Ward 2; D, 2027), vacant (Ward 3; D, 2026), Rosetta "Rosie" McCamery (Ward 5; D, 2027), Isabel Sousa (Ward 1; D, 2026), and Cynthia Johnson (Council-at-Large; D, 2028).

In January 2020, the borough council appointed Isabel Sousa to fill the First Ward seat expiring in December 2020 that had been held by Denise Wilkerson until she resigned from office to take a seat as the at-large councilmember.

Council President Kim Shaw was named to serve as acting mayor in March 2015, after Jamel Holley was named to fill a vacant seat in the New Jersey General Assembly. She served until Dansereau was sworn in on March 11, 2015, making her the first woman to serve as mayor in borough history.

=== Federal, state and county representation ===
Roselle is located in the 10th Congressional District and is part of New Jersey's 20th state legislative district.

For the 119th United States Congress, New Jersey's 10th congressional district is represented by LaMonica McIver (D, Newark). New Jersey is represented in the United States Senate by Democrats Cory Booker (Newark, term ends 2027) and Andy Kim (Moorestown, term ends 2031).

For the 2026–2027 session, the 20th legislative district of the New Jersey Legislature is represented in the State Senate by Joseph Cryan (D, Union Township) and in the General Assembly by Annette Quijano (D, Elizabeth) and Ed Rodriguez (D, Elizabeth).

Union County is governed by a Board of County Commissioners, whose nine members are elected at-large to three-year terms of office on a staggered basis with three seats coming up for election each year, with an appointed County Manager overseeing the day-to-day operations of the county. At an annual reorganization meeting held in the beginning of January, the board selects a Chair and Vice Chair from among its members. As of 2026, Union County's County Commissioners are:

Vice Chair Rebecca Williams (D, Plainfield, 2028), Chairman Joesph Bodek (D, Linden, 2026), James E. Baker Jr. (D, Rahway, 2027), Michele Delisfort (D, Union Township, 2026), Lourdes M. Leon (D, Elizabeth, 2026), Alexander Mirabella (D, Fanwood, 2027) Kimberly Palmieri-Mouded (D, Westfield, 2027). Stanley J. Neron (D, Elizabeth, 2028), Joseph Signorello III (D, Roselle Park, 2028)

Constitutional officers elected on a countywide basis are: Clerk Vacant - Incumbent Clerk Joanne Rajoppi (D, Union Township) died on July 16, 2026. Her death triggered a special election for a full five-year term to be held concurrently with the November 2026 general election. Deputy Clerk Clara Fernández assumes the powers of the office until the vacancy is filled. Sheriff Peter Corvelli (D, Kenilworth, 2026) and Surrogate Christopher E. Hudak (D, Clark, 2027).

=== Politics ===
As of March 2011, there were a total of 11,743 registered voters in Roselle, of which 7,127 (60.7% vs. 41.8% countywide) were registered as Democrats, 526 (4.5% vs. 15.3%) were registered as Republicans and 4,087 (34.8% vs. 42.9%) were registered as Unaffiliated. There were 3 voters registered as Libertarians or Greens. Among the borough's 2010 Census population, 55.7% (vs. 53.3% in Union County) were registered to vote, including 72.8% of those ages 18 and over (vs. 70.6% countywide).

United States presidential election results for Roselle
Year	Republican		Democratic		Third party(ies)	
Year	No.	%	No.	%	No.	%
2024	1,845	20.94%	6,839	77.64%	125	1.42%
2020	1,318	13.72%	8,219	85.53%	72	0.75%
2016	981	11.27%	7,558	86.80%	168	1.93%
2012	875	9.76%	8,034	89.65%	53	0.59%
2008	1,262	13.47%	8,055	85.98%	52	0.56%
2004	1,564	19.73%	6,325	79.77%	40	0.50%

In the 2012 presidential election, Democrat Barack Obama received 8,034 votes (88.8% vs. 66.0% countywide), ahead of Republican Mitt Romney with 875 votes (9.7% vs. 32.3%) and other candidates with 53 votes (0.6% vs. 0.8%), among the 9,043 ballots cast by the borough's 12,694 registered voters, for a turnout of 71.2% (vs. 68.8% in Union County). In the 2008 presidential election, Democrat Barack Obama received 8,055 votes (85.4% vs. 63.1% countywide), ahead of Republican John McCain with 1,262 votes (13.4% vs. 35.2%) and other candidates with 52 votes (0.6% vs. 0.9%), among the 9,428 ballots cast by the borough's 12,533 registered voters, for a turnout of 75.2% (vs. 74.7% in Union County). In the 2004 presidential election, Democrat John Kerry received 6,325 votes (79.4% vs. 58.3% countywide), ahead of Republican George W. Bush with 1,564 votes (19.6% vs. 40.3%) and other candidates with 40 votes (0.5% vs. 0.7%), among the 7,971 ballots cast by the borough's 11,609 registered voters, for a turnout of 68.7% (vs. 72.3% in the whole county).

Gubernatorial election results for Roselle
Year	Republican		Democratic		Third party(ies)	
Year	No.	%	No.	%	No.	%
2025	816	12.60%	5,610	86.61%	51	0.79%
2021	639	14.58%	3,711	84.65%	34	0.78%
2017	476	10.91%	3,823	87.60%	65	1.49%
2013	1,115	27.59%	2,882	71.32%	44	1.09%
2009	866	17.72%	3,816	78.08%	205	4.19%
2005	786	16.01%	3,997	81.44%	125	2.55%

In the 2017 gubernatorial election, Democrat Phil Murphy received 3,823 votes (87.6% vs. 65.2% countywide), ahead of Republican Kim Guadagno with 476 votes (10.9% vs. 32.6%), and other candidates with 65 votes (1.5% vs. 2.1%), among the 4,549 ballots cast by the borough's 13,091 registered voters, for a turnout of 34.7%. In the 2013 gubernatorial election, Democrat Barbara Buono received 71.3% of the vote (2,882 cast), ahead of Republican Chris Christie with 27.6% (1,115 votes), and other candidates with 1.1% (44 votes), among the 4,283 ballots cast by the borough's 12,460 registered voters (242 ballots were spoiled), for a turnout of 34.4%. In the 2009 gubernatorial election, Democrat Jon Corzine received 3,816 ballots cast (77.3% vs. 50.6% countywide), ahead of Republican Chris Christie with 866 votes (17.5% vs. 41.7%), Independent Chris Daggett with 170 votes (3.4% vs. 5.9%) and other candidates with 35 votes (0.7% vs. 0.8%), among the 4,939 ballots cast by the borough's 12,148 registered voters, yielding a 40.7% turnout (vs. 46.5% in the county).

United States Senate election results for Roselle1
Year	Republican		Democratic		Third party(ies)	
Year	No.	%	No.	%	No.	%
2024	1,434	18.18%	6,242	79.12%	213	2.70%
2018	692	10.46%	5,517	83.43%	404	6.11%
2012	697	9.05%	6,905	89.64%	101	1.31%
2006	775	17.51%	3,542	80.03%	109	2.46%

United States Senate election results for Roselle2
Year	Republican		Democratic		Third party(ies)	
Year	No.	%	No.	%	No.	%
2020	1,058	11.18%	8,203	86.66%	205	2.17%
2014	381	9.78%	3,475	89.17%	41	1.05%
2013	346	10.98%	2,778	88.13%	28	0.89%
2008	1,008	13.38%	6,391	84.81%	137	1.82%

== Education ==
Students are educated by the Roselle Public Schools, which serves students in pre-kindergarten through twelfth grade. As of the 2023–24 school year, the district, comprised of seven schools, had an enrollment of 3,080 students and 247.5 classroom teachers (on an FTE basis), for a student–teacher ratio of 12.5:1. Schools in the district (with 2023–24 enrollment data from the National Center for Education Statistics) are Kindergarten Success Academy with 219 students in Kindergarten, Harrison Elementary School with 310 students in grades 1–4, Dr. Charles C. Polk Elementary School with 277 students in grades 1–4, Washington Elementary School with 358 students in grades 1–4, Leonard V. Moore Middle School with 457 students in grades 5–6, Grace Wilday Junior High School with 484 students in grades 7–8 and Abraham Clark High School with 918 students in grades 9–12.

Roselle Catholic High School, a parochial high school run by the Marist Brothers, serves grades 9–12 under the supervision of the Roman Catholic Archdiocese of Newark.

St. Joseph the Carpenter School, which was founded in 1913, serves students in preschool through eighth grade, operating under the supervision of the Newark Archdiocese.

== Transportation ==
=== Roads and highways ===
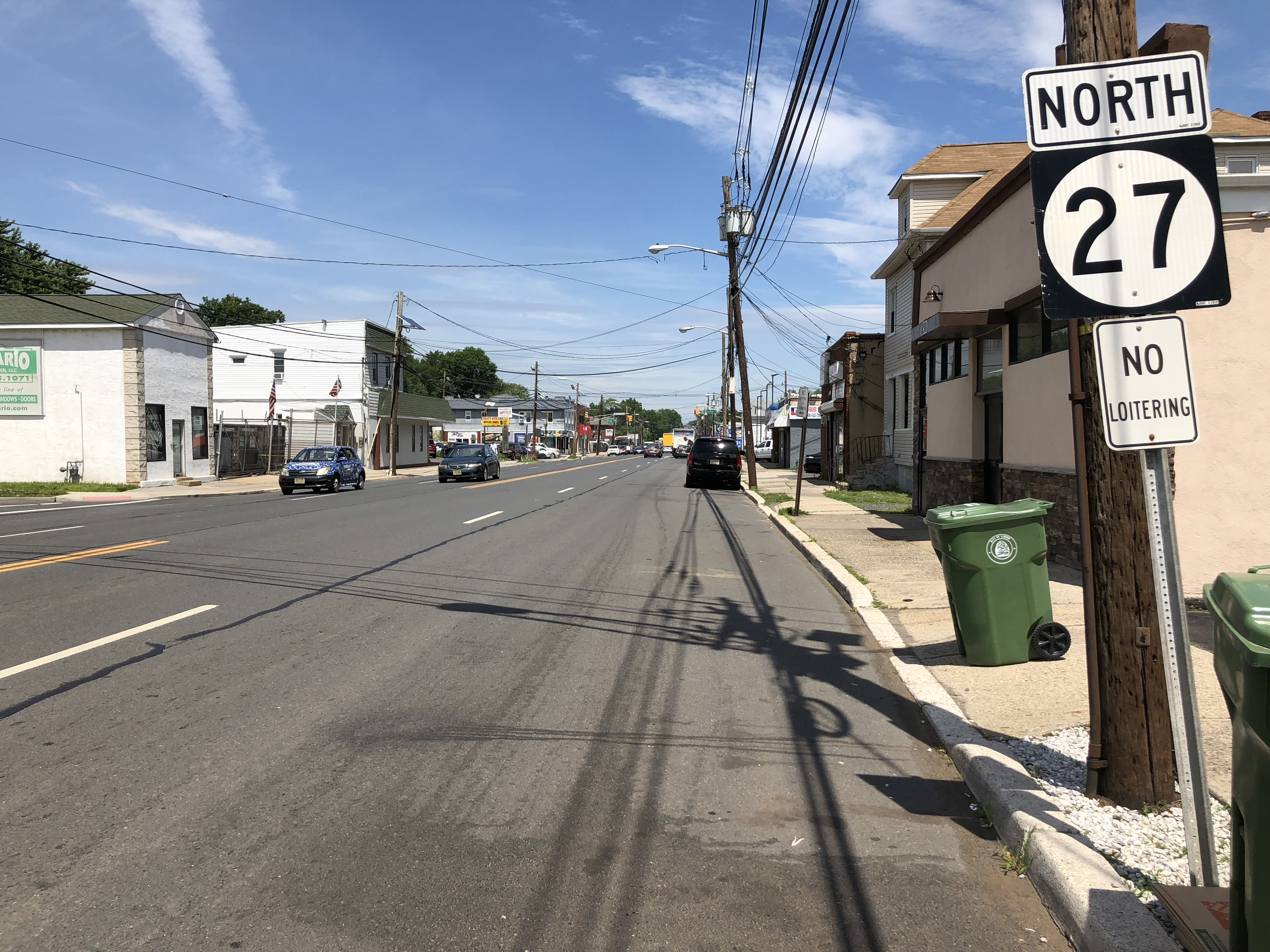
Route 27 northbound on the southeast edge of Roselle

As of May 2010, the borough had a total of 49.96 miles (80.40 km) of roadways, of which 40.32 miles (64.89 km) were maintained by the municipality, 8.60 miles (13.84 km) by Union County and 1.04 miles (1.67 km) by the New Jersey Department of Transportation.

Route 27 is the most significant highway in Roselle. It forms the borough's southeastern border with Linden.

=== Public transportation ===
NJ Transit provides bus service to the Port Authority Bus Terminal in Midtown Manhattan on the 112 and 115 routes, to Newark on the 59, 62 and 94 routes, with local service available on the 56 and 57.

Conrail's freight-only Lehigh Line passes through the community along the tracks of the former Lehigh Valley Railroad. The town once shared a passenger station with Roselle Park on the mainline of the Central Railroad of New Jersey. That line is abandoned.

The Staten Island Railway passed through the community before being dormant for years. It was reactivated by the Morristown & Erie Railway, with new grade crossing gates installed in the borough as part of the 7-mile (11 km) route between Cranford and Linden.

Newark Liberty International Airport is approximately 6 miles (9.7 km) from Roselle.

== Notable people ==
People who were born in, residents of, or otherwise closely associated with Roselle include:

- Rabih Abdullah (born 1975), running back who played for the Tampa Bay Buccaneers and New England Patriots
- Reginald Atkins (born 1967), pastor and politician, who has represented the 20th Legislative District in the New Jersey General Assembly since 2022.
- Charles Augustus Briggs (1841–1913), Presbyterian theologian
- Abraham Clark (1725–1794), a founding father of the United States of America and a signer of the United States Declaration of Independence
- Neil M. Cohen (born 1951), represented the 20th Legislative District in the New Jersey General Assembly until being forced to suddenly resign after child pornography was discovered on his computer
- Greg Cook (1958–2005), basketball player
- Leo Disend (1915–1985), tackle who played in the NFL for the Brooklyn Dodgers and Green Bay Packers
- Harold Dobbs (1918–1994), Republican politician and civic leader in San Francisco who founded Mel's Drive-In and served as president of the city's Board of Supervisors
- Jameel Dumas (born 1981), linebacker who played in NFL Europe
- William Perry Fogg (1826–1909), author and adventurer
- Jerry Green (born 1939), politician, who has served in the New Jersey General Assembly since 1992, where he represents the 22nd Legislative District
- Rosey Grier (born 1932), former football player in the NFL for the Los Angeles Rams, a member of the original Fearsome Foursome
- Al Harrington (born 1980), professional basketball player who formerly played for the NBA's New York Knicks
- Jamel Holley (born 1979), politician who was chosen in 2015 to serve as a member of the New Jersey General Assembly representing the 20th Legislative District, after having served as mayor of Roselle since 2012
- Jesse Holley (born 1984), signed by the Cincinnati Bengals as an undrafted free agent in 2007, he was winner of the Spike TV reality show 4th and Long
- Gene-Ann Polk Horne (1926–2015), physician and hospital administrator, director of pediatric ambulatory care at Harlem Hospital and professor of pediatrics at Columbia University
- Phil Ivey (born 1976), professional poker player
- Kendall James (born 1991), football cornerback who has played in the NFL for the Cleveland Browns
- James G. McLoughlin (1919–2014), publisher and serviceman
- Emil Milan (1922–1985), mid-century designer craftsman who worked primarily in wood
- Barron Miles (born 1972), defensive back for the BC Lions in the Canadian Football League
- Rebecca Morse (born 1992), ice hockey defender, currently playing for the Metropolitan Riveters of the National Women's Hockey League
- Carole Dawn Reinhart (born 1941), trumpet player and professor in Vienna
- Charles August Sulzer (1879–1919), delegate to the United States House of Representatives from the Alaska Territory
- William H. Tunner (1906–1983), general officer in the United States Air Force
- Lucius Walker (1930–2010), Baptist minister best known for his opposition to the United States embargo against Cuba

== See also ==
- Identical Twins, Roselle, New Jersey, 1967, a photograph by Diane Arbus of the Wade twins
