= Parker-Smith =

Parker-Smith is a surname. Notable people with the surname include:

- Jane Parker-Smith (1950–2020), British classical organist
- Johnson Parker-Smith (1882–1926), British Olympic lacrosse player

== See also ==
- James Parker Smith (1854–1929), Scottish barrister and politician
- Marjorie Parker Smith (1916–2009), American figure skater
- T. Parker Smith (graduated 1888), American business college leader
