= Winceyco =

New Jersey entertainment group

Winceyco, LLC
- Type: Limited liability company
- Industry: Arts, education, publishing
- Founded: 2003
- Founder: Wincey Terry
- Headquarters: Vauxhall, New Jersey, U.S.
- Area served: New Jersey
- Key people: Wincey Terry, CEO
- Website: Winceyco.com

Winceyco is an entertainment group specializing in education in the state of New Jersey, with an emphasis on musical assembly series for schools and churches. The company was founded by Wincey Terry, a professional vocalist who has worked with Spike Lee, Bill Cosby, Tina Turner, and Garrison Keilor. The group travels throughout the New Jersey region, delivering about 100 performances annually.

== Programs and services ==
"Black Wax" was a production featuring Wincey Terry, a trio of musicians, and five actors and singers, and including a musical number paying tribute to "inventions created by African Americans, including the refrigerator, the pencil sharper, the gas mask, horseshoes, peanut butter, and crystallized sugar." "African Discovery through Music" was a musical chronicle of the Underground Railroad that was televised live.

According to the Winceyco website, the business has expanded into book publishing.
