= Gene-Ann Polk =

American physician and professor (1926–2015)

- Gene-Ann Polk, from a 2015 obituary.
- Born: Gene-Ann Polk; October 3, 1926; Roselle, New Jersey, U.S.
- Died: January 3, 2015 (aged 88); Lafayette Hill, Pennsylvania, U.S.
- Occupations: Physician, hospital administrator, professor
- Spouse: Edwin Clay Horne
- Children: 2

Gene-Ann Polk Horne (October 3, 1926 – January 3, 2015), known professionally as Gene-Ann Polk, was an American physician and hospital administrator, director of pediatric ambulatory care at Harlem Hospital, and a professor of pediatrics at Columbia University.

== Early life and education ==
Gene-Ann Polk was born in Roselle, New Jersey to Charles Carrington Polk and Olive Mae (Bond) Polk. Both of her parents were Howard University alumni; her father was a physician, and her mother was active in Girl Scouting, education, health, and other community activities. Her godmother was physician Myra Smith Kearse, mother of judge Amalya Lyle Kearse. She studied piano and cello in her youth, and was selected for the New Jersey All-State Orchestra twice.

She graduated from Abraham Clark High School in Roselle. She briefly studied music at Howard University, then moved her studies to Oberlin College, where she completed a bachelor's degree in 1948. She earned a medical degree at the Women's Medical College of Pennsylvania in 1952. She also earned a master's degree in public health at Columbia University.

== Career ==
Polk had a long career at Harlem Hospital, from 1953 when she began her residency, to her retirement in 1994. She was director of pediatric ambulatory care at Harlem Hospital from 1968 to 1975, director of pediatrics from 1975 to 1978, and director of ambulatory care services (1978–1994). She also chaired the Cultural Affairs committee of the hospital's medical board, from 1988 to 1994, and was credited with protecting and restoring the hospital's WPA murals. She was a professor of clinical pediatrics at Columbia University's College of Physicians and Surgeons from 1962 to 1994.

Polk was an expert in neonatal drug exposure and established a neonatal transfusion program at Harlem Hospital to address drug dependency in newborns. Polk was an active member of the Alpha Kappa Alpha sorority, and helped establish the Susan Smith McKinney Steward Medical Society. In late 2014, she gave an oral history interview for the Foundation for the History of Women in Medicine, Center for the History of Medicine at Countway Library, Harvard University.

== Personal life ==
Gene-Ann Polk married oral surgeon Edwin Clay Horne. They lived in Englewood, New Jersey, and had two children, Edwin and Carol. She died from pancreatic cancer in January 2015, aged 88 years, at her home in Lafayette Hill, Pennsylvania. Her papers are in the Schomburg Center for Research in Black Culture.
