= Essex County prostitute killings =

Serial murder case in Essex County, New Jersey

- Map highlighting Newark in Essex County, New Jersey, where most of the killings occurred
- Location: Essex County, New Jersey, United States
- Date: March 4, 1993 – February 11, 1998
- Target: Prostitutes
- Attack type: Serial killings
- Deaths: 14–15
- Perpetrator: Multiple

The Essex County prostitute killings were the murders of at least fourteen women involved in prostitution in Essex County, New Jersey, between 1993 and 1998. Despite the murders taking place in three separate cities, an investigative team tied them to a single serial killer, and a task force was set up to investigate. As evidence emerged, it became evident that multiple perpetrators were responsible, and several suspects were investigated but none were ever officially connected to the case.

== Murders ==
The killer[s] chose black women between the ages of 19 and 37, most of whom worked as prostitutes, and the victims were killed in three separate ways; some victims were strangled, some were stabbed, and others were suffocated. Nine murders occurred in Newark, three others were in Irvington, and the other two occurred in East Orange. According to investigators, the first victim attributed to the case was 34-year-old Diane Floyd, who was found murdered in her apartment on March 4, 1993. Other victims include 37-year-old Valerie Wilson, whose body was found in a lot on April 4, 1997; 28-year-old Sharon Smith, whose body was found in a dumpster on November 22, 1997; 30-year-old Yolanda Earp, whose body was found on November 23, 1997; and 30-year-old Yvonne Lee, whose body was found on February 11, 1998.

Despite inconsistencies in modus operandi, a high-ranking law enforcement source told The Star-Ledger in 1998 that "All indication points to a serial killer."

== Investigation ==
On March 31, 1998, Essex County prosecutor Patricia A. Hurt appointed a task force to investigate the murders. It was formed a month after the Newark Police Director Joseph Santiago publicly expressed concern in the murders. In May, the murder of a prostitute named Diane Rodriguez was initially believed to be linked to the case, although the task force said her murder showed no similarities.

=== Suspects ===
- Bharat Malde – On July 8, 1998, 31-year-old Bharat Malde of Roselle was arrested after he was identified by five prostitutes as the man who abducted and sexually assaulted them in incidents spanning from February to May of that year. Malde had posed as an undercover police officer to lure the women into his vehicle, before driving them to secluded locations and raping them. While he was publicly named a suspect in the murders in August 1998, police struggled to gather evidence linking him to any of the deaths. In June 1999, Malde was sentenced to six-years in prison for the sexual assaults.
- Harrison Hogue – On October 14, 1998, 59-year-old Harrison Hogue was arrested and charged with the 1997 murder of Valerie Wilson. Hogue was known to prostitutes in the area who had suspected him in the murder. He was also suspected in several of the other murders, but little to no evidence could link him. On October 18, Hogue was found incompetent to stand trial for Wilson's murder. After a 30-day stay in a psychiatric hospital, Hogue was declared competent to stand trial in January 1999, although prosecutors ultimately did not move forward.

== See also ==
- List of serial killers in the United States
