= Myra Smith Kearse =

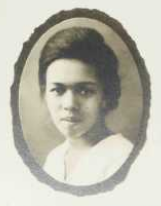
- Myra Lyle Smith, from the 1917 yearbook of Howard Academy.
- Born: Myra Lyle Smith; May 18, 1899; Lynchburg, Virginia
- Died: February 14, 1982 (aged 82); Vauxhall, New Jersey
- Children: Amalya Lyle Kearse
- Parent: T. Parker Smith

Myra Smith Kearse (May 18, 1899 – February 14, 1982) was an American physician and community leader in New Jersey.

== Early life ==
Myra Lyle Smith was born in Lynchburg, Virginia, the daughter of T. Parker Smith and Clara Alexander Smith. Her father was an educator, and founded a business college in Richmond. Her mother was also an educator.

She graduated from Howard Academy in 1917, earned a bachelor's degree at Howard University in 1922, and was the only woman in the 1925 graduating class of the Howard University College of Medicine. She was a member of the Alpha Kappa Alpha sorority.

== Career ==
Kearse was the first African-American woman physician in Union County, New Jersey when she began to practice there in 1938. She joined the staff of a Newark hospital during World War II. She held a patent on a "pocket calendar device with punch means" for tracking one's menstrual cycle. She retired from medical practice in 1966.

In 1964, Kearse and Vera Brantley McMillon began collecting and sharing oral histories of African-American life in New Jersey, to mark the state's tercentenary; their work culminated in the publication of Negroes of New Jersey, 1715-1967: A Bibliography. She served on the executive committee of the Union County Anti-Poverty Council, until she retired from the council in 1970. She was a founding member of the county's College Women's Club.

== Personal life ==
Myra Lyle Smith married Robert Freeman Kearse, postmaster of Vauxhall, New Jersey. They had a son Robert A. Kearse, and a daughter Amalya Lyle Kearse, who became a federal judge. Her god-daughter, Gene-Ann Polk Horne, was a noted pediatrician at Harlem Hospital for many years. The Myra Smith Kearse Community Center in Union County, and a scholarship fund, were named in her honor. She died in 1982, aged 82, from a heart attack at her home in the Vauxhall section of Union Township, Union County, New Jersey.
