= Greg Cook (basketball) =

American basketball player (1958–2005)

- Cook with the LSU Tigers

Personal information
- Born: December 8, 1958 Newark, New Jersey, U.S.
- Died: March 19, 2005 (aged 46) Houston, Texas, U.S.
- Listed height: 6 ft 8 in (2.03 m)
- Listed weight: 225 lb (102 kg)

Career information
- High school: Abraham Clark (Roselle, New Jersey)
- College: LSU (1976–1981)
- NBA draft: 1981: 2nd round, 40th overall pick
- Drafted by: New York Knicks
- Position: Center / power forward

Career history
- 1984–1985: Wyoming Wildcatters
- Stats at Basketball Reference

Gregory Olin Cook (December 8, 1958 – March 19, 2005) was an American basketball player. Nicknamed "Cookieman", he played collegiately for the LSU Tigers and was renowned for his defensive prowess.

Cook posted his best statistics during his freshman season in 1976–77 when he averaged 11.5 points and 9.2 rebounds. He sat out the 1977–78 season before returning for his three final seasons. During those years, Cook helped lead the Tigers to an SEC tournament championship in 1980 and an NCAA Final Four appearance in 1981. He was selected by the New York Knicks as the 40th overall pick in the 1981 NBA draft but never played in the league. Cook played briefly in the Continental Basketball Association (CBA), appearing in five games for the Wyoming Wildcatters in the 1984–85 season.

Cook died in his sleep in Houston, Texas, aged 46.

== Career statistics ==
Legend
GP	Games played	GS	Games started	MPG	Minutes per game
FG%	Field goal percentage	3P%	3-point field goal percentage	FT%	Free throw percentage
RPG	Rebounds per game	APG	Assists per game	SPG	Steals per game
BPG	Blocks per game	PPG	Points per game	**Bold**	Career high

=== College ===
Year	Team	GP	GS	MPG	FG%	3P%	FT%	RPG	APG	SPG	BPG	PPG
1976–77	LSU	27	**27**	**30.1**	.462	–	.589	**9.2**	1.9	–	–	**11.5**
1978–79	LSU	28	–	–	.465	–	.617	6.3	2.1	–	–	6.3
1979–80	LSU	31	–	29.1	.400	–	.659	5.8	**2.7**	**1.1**	**.2**	4.4
1980–81	LSU	**33**	26	28.6	**.564**	–	**.710**	5.3	1.6	1.0	.1	9.2
Career		119	53	29.2	.480	–	.646	6.6	2.1	1.0	.1	7.8
