= Jamel Holley =

American politician (born 1979)

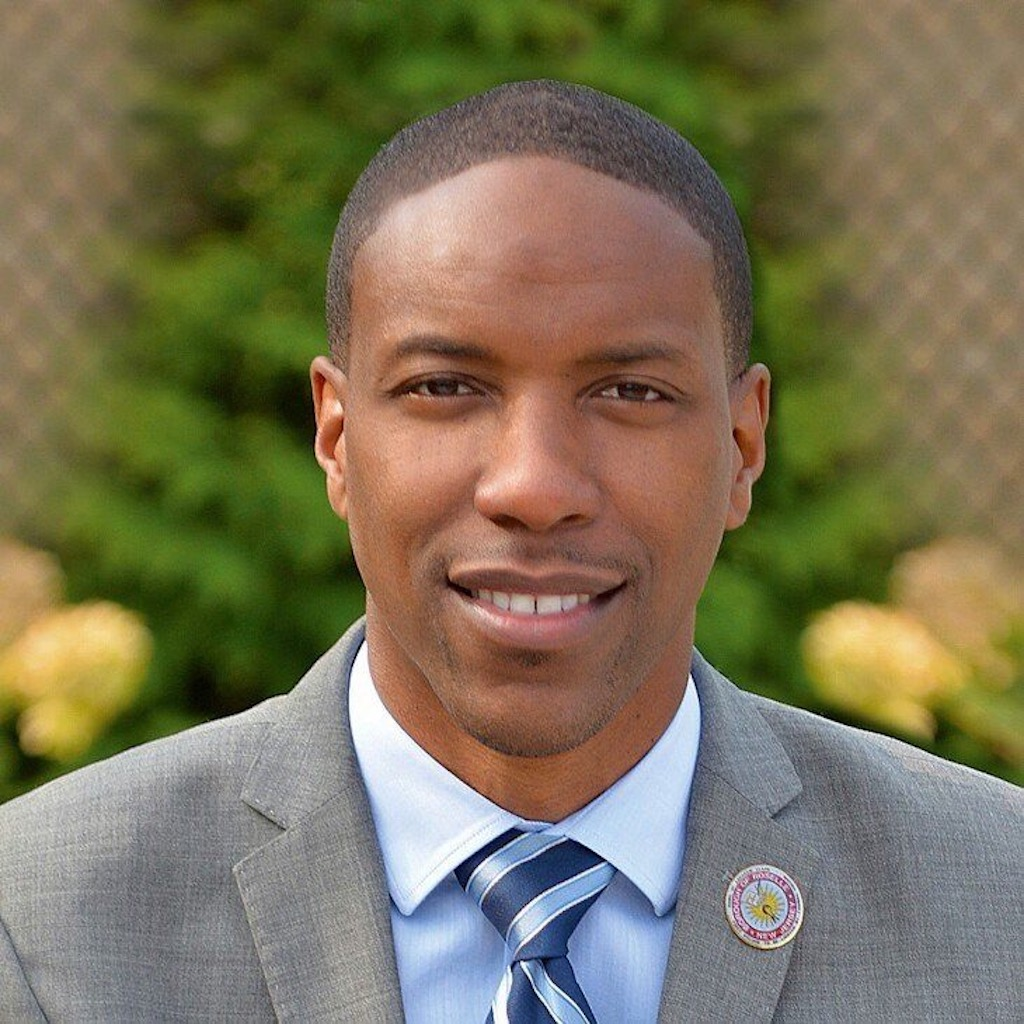
- Holley in 2020

Member of the New Jersey General Assembly from the 20th District
- In office January 21, 2015 – January 11, 2022 Serving with Annette Quijano
- Preceded by: Joseph Cryan
- Succeeded by: Reginald Atkins

Mayor of Roselle, New Jersey
- In office January 1, 2012 – January 21, 2015
- Preceded by: Garrett Smith
- Succeeded by: Christine Dansereau

Personal details
- Born: Jamel Curtis Holley; September 13, 1979 (age 47)
- Party: Democratic
- Education: New Jersey City University (B.S.); Kean University (M.P.A.)
- Website: www.njleg.state.nj.us/members/BIO.asp?Leg=374

Jamel Curtis Holley (born September 13, 1979) is an American Democratic Party politician from the state of New Jersey, who served in the New Jersey General Assembly representing the 20th Legislative District from 2015 to 2022. He is the first African American to represent the district, serving out the unexpired term of former Assemblyman and now State Senator Joseph Cryan, and formerly served as councilman and then mayor of Roselle, New Jersey; at age 32, he was the borough's youngest-ever mayor. In 2021, Holley unsuccessfully challenged Cryan in the June 2021 New Jersey State Senate primary, losing by 29 points.

== Early life ==
Holley graduated from Abraham Clark High School in Roselle in 1997, received a Bachelor of Science in Criminal Justice from New Jersey City University in 2002, and earned a Master of Public Administration from Kean University in 2006. In 2001, he was appointed as Chief of Staff to Neil M. Cohen of New Jersey's 20th Legislative District, the youngest Chief of Staff for any of New Jersey's 120 legislators.

He works for Irvington as the Director of Public Works under Mayor Tony Vauss.

== Political career ==
On November 2, 2004, Holley won the General Election for Councilman at Large in the Borough of Roselle, becoming Union County's youngest Councilman at age 25. Commissioned by the New Jersey Democratic State Committee to serve as a committee member at the 2004 Democratic National Convention, he won re-election to his at-large seat following year. He made history by officiating the first gay wedding in New Jersey "forever cementing himself into the annals of queer liberation."

=== Mayor of Roselle ===
Holley was elected Mayor of the Borough of Roselle in November 2011, becoming Roselle's youngest mayor in its 117-year history. He ran unopposed for mayor after defeating two-term Mayor Garrett Smith in the Borough's Democratic primaries in June, despite Smith having the support of U.S. Congressman Donald M. Payne of New Jersey's 10th District. Holley's running mates were then-Councilman-elect Randy Sandifer and then-Councilman Yves. F. Aubourg, Mayor Holley began his term on January 1, 2012 and was officially inaugurated on January 6, at age 32. He joined nearly 50 other Union County Democrats to endorse Newark Mayor Cory Booker for his bid for the U.S. Senate in 2013, and supported Raymond Lesniak's successful bid for senate reelection in New Jersey's 20th District.

After the acquittal of George Zimmerman in the Trayvon Martin murder trial, Mayor Holley and Roselle's Borough Council submitted a formal plea to President Barack Obama and U.S. Attorney General Eric Holder to investigate alleged violations of civil rights relating to the 2012 fatal shooting. Roselle was the first Union County municipality to appeal to the Obama administration for further examination of the case after Zimmerman was found not guilty of second-degree murder and manslaughter charges.

=== Same-sex marriage ===
On October 21, 2013, hours after a New Jersey Superior Court ruling allowing same-sex marriages to proceed, Holley officiated the wedding of Marsha Shapiro and Louise Walpin — the lead plaintiffs in the lawsuit that brought marriage equality to New Jersey — at 12:01 AM at the home of State Senator Ray Lesniak in Elizabeth. The couple had been together for 24 years. The ceremony was among the first same-sex marriages performed in New Jersey history, and was photographed and reported on by The New York Times.

=== New Jersey Assembly ===
Holley was unanimously chosen by Democratic committee members of the 20th district to fill the Assembly seat of Joseph Cryan, who resigned in 2015 to become the Union County Sheriff. He has since won two additional two-year terms in the Assembly, serving with Democratic running mate Annette Quijano.

==== Committees ====
- Homeland Security and State Preparedness
- Health and Senior Services

==== 2021 New Jersey State Senate election ====
Holley announced in January 2021 that he would challenge Joseph Cryan in the June 8, 2021 primary for New Jersey State Senate. He lost the primary to Cryan.

=== Vaccine choice and parental rights ===
In early 2020, Holley opposed New Jersey Assembly Bill A3818, which sought to eliminate religious exemptions from childhood vaccination requirements. Holley, who has stated that he personally supports vaccines as medicine, framed his opposition as a defense of parental rights and religious freedom, writing: "I do not believe that elected officials should be overreaching into the households of parents who are entitled to make informed medical decisions for their children." He reported receiving more than 3,000 constituent emails opposing the bill and argued the legislature had not allowed sufficient public debate.

Holley characterized a last-minute compromise amendment — which would have permitted private but not public schools to accept unvaccinated children — as an unconstitutional "segregation amendment" favoring wealthier families. He subsequently co-sponsored Senate bills S-1734 (requiring 48-hour advance disclosure of vaccine ingredients) and S-1791 (making the state liable for injuries from mandated vaccines), and traveled to Connecticut to speak alongside attorney Robert F. Kennedy Jr. in opposition to similar legislation there. Holley also maintains an active social media presence on the issue.

=== Public Record ===
In August 2009, the New Jersey Attorney General's Office charged Holley by accusation with illegally filling out portions of absentee ballots belonging to at least 20 voters during the 2006 Democratic primary for Borough Council — a third-degree crime carrying a maximum sentence of five years in prison. The charges were resolved through a pre-trial intervention program, over the objections of the attorney general's office. In 2016, his successor as Roselle Mayor, Christine Dansereau, accused him of harassment and intimidation in a police report; Dansereau later resigned for health reasons in June 2020.

== Electoral history ==
=== New Jersey Senate ===
New Jersey primary election, 2021
Party	Candidate	Votes	%	±%
Democratic	Joseph Cryan (incumbent)	7,804	62.5%	
Democratic	Jamel Holley	4,176	33.5%	
Democratic	Jason F. Krychiw	502	4.0%	
Total votes		12,482	100.0%	

=== New Jersey Assembly ===
New Jersey general election, 2019
Party	Candidate	Votes	%	±%
Democratic	Annette Quijano (Incumbent)	13,173	40.75	▼4.65
Democratic	Jamel Holley (Incumbent)	12,437	38.48	▼6.12
Republican	Charles Donnelly	3,496	10.82	▼1.7
Republican	Ashraf Hanna	3,218	9.96	▼1.7
Total votes		53,372	100.0	

New Jersey general election, 2017
Party	Candidate	Votes	%	±%
Democratic	Annette Quijano (Incumbent)	24,221	45.4	▲6.0
Democratic	Jamel Holley (Incumbent)	23,790	44.6	▲6.8
Republican	Joseph G. Aubourg	5,361	10.0	▼1.7
Total votes		53,372	100.0	

New Jersey general election, 2015
Party	Candidate	Votes	%	±%
Democratic	Annette Quijano (Incumbent)	12,061	39.4	▲3.9
Democratic	Jamel Holley (Incumbent)	11,568	37.8	▲1.5
Republican	Stephen E. Kozlovich	3,593	11.7	▼2.8
Republican	Roger Stryeski	3,398	11.1	▼2.6
Total votes		30,620	100.0	

New Jersey General Assembly
Preceded by Joseph Cryan	Member of the New Jersey General Assembly for the 20th District; January 21, 2015 – January 11, 2022; With: Annette Quijano	Succeeded by Reginald Atkins
Political offices
Preceded by Garrett Smith	Mayor of Roselle, New Jersey; January 1, 2012 – January 21, 2015	Succeeded by Christine Dansereau
