= Rabih Abdullah =

American football player (born 1975)

No. 26, 27
- Position: Running back

Personal information
- Born: April 27, 1975 (age 51); Martinsville, Virginia, U.S.
- Listed height: 6 ft 0 in (1.83 m)
- Listed weight: 235 lb (107 kg)

Career information
- High school: Roselle (NJ) Abraham Clark
- College: Lehigh (1993-1997)
- NFL draft: 1998: undrafted

Career history
- Tampa Bay Buccaneers (1998–2001); Chicago Bears (2002–2003); New England Patriots (2004)

Awards and highlights
- Super Bowl champion (XXXIX)

Career NFL statistics
- Rushing yards: 172
- Rushing average: 2.7
- Rushing touchdowns: 1
- Stats at Pro Football Reference

Rabih Abdullah (born April 27, 1975) is an American former professional football player who was a running back in the National Football League (NFL). He played college football for the Lehigh Mountain Hawks.

== Early life ==
Abdullah grew up in Roselle, New Jersey, where he attended Abraham Clark High School and was a letterman in football, basketball, and track. In football, he was a starter as a running back and as a defensive back, and was an All-County selection, All-Conference selection, and an All-State selection.

== College career ==
Abdullah played for Lehigh University from 1993-97. In 1995, as a junior, he rushed for 1,536 yards, setting the school's single-season rushing record as Lehigh finished 8-3 and won the Patriot League. He set the school record for rushing yards in a single game, with 266 yards on the ground in a 34-23 victory over Colgate. 1996, which would have been his senior season, was cut short by a serious knee injury, but he was able to secure a medical redshirt, and return for a fifth season. His final season at Lehigh was in 1997, when he rushed for a total of 1,225 yards, earning the Archibald Cup, which is awarded annually to Lehigh's most outstanding player. In his final collegiate game, against arch-rival Lafayette, his efforts in a 43-31 Lehigh victory earned him the rivalry's annual Most Outstanding Player Award. He finished his career with a total of 3,696 yards on the ground, a school record.

== Professional career ==
Abdullah was signed in 1998 as an undrafted free agent by the Tampa Bay Buccaneers, where he played mostly special teams, starting one game at running back before being released following the 2001 season. He signed with the Chicago Bears for 2002, but was released just before the beginning of the 2004 season. He signed with the New England Patriots just after the season began, was released in November, and re-signed shortly before Christmas. That re-signing meant that he was a member of the Patriots for Super Bowl XXXIX, becoming just the second Lehigh graduate to play in the game (the first was Steve Kreider, who played for the Cincinnati Bengals in Super Bowl XVI).
