= Jameel Dumas =

American football player (born 1981)

No. 51, 50
- Position: Linebacker

Personal information
- Born: February 18, 1981 (age 45)
- Listed height: 6 ft 4 in (1.93 m)
- Listed weight: 250 lb (113 kg)

Career information
- High school: Roselle (NJ) Abraham Clark
- College: Syracuse
- NFL draft: 2003: undrafted

Career history
- Albany Conquest (2005); Rhein Fire (2006); Berlin Thunder (2007)

Jameel Dumas (born February 18, 1981) is an American former football linebacker. He played for Syracuse University from 2000 to 2003, where he made 179 tackles and earned All-American honors. After suffering a knee injury in the first game of his fifth-year senior season, Dumas missed the remainder of the year. After recovering from knee surgery, he played with the Albany Conquest in 2005 as a two-way player. He also played in the NFL Europa with the Rhein Fire in 2006 and Berlin Thunder in 2007.

== Early life ==
Dumas attended Abraham Clark High School in Roselle, New Jersey, where he was a star linebacker for the football team and hurdler for the track team. His high school coach Lou Grasso praised Dumas for his talent: "He's one of the outstanding players in this area. He's one of the hardest hitters I've had in a long time. He's definitely a Division I player." He played both fullback and linebacker in his senior year and was selected as a first-team all-state player as a senior. In his final year of prep football, Dumas had 120 tackles, 650 rushing yards and 16 touchdowns, and helped Abraham Clark advance to the North Jersey Group II state semifinals. In July 2003, he played in the Governor's Bowl, an all-star game matching the best players from New York and New Jersey. Dumas was singled out as one of "the defensive heroes" of the game for New Jersey.

== Recruiting ==
Dumas was a highly touted recruit in his senior year of high school. He was 6 feet, 3 inches tall, weighed 215 pounds, and had excellent speed. He received scholarship offers from Rutgers, Ole Miss, West Virginia, North Carolina State, Wisconsin, Indiana, and Minnesota, but he chose Syracuse University. He orally committed to Syracuse in August 1998, and signed a national letter of intent with Syracuse in February 1999. Dumas explained his choice of Syracuse, "I came to Syracuse because I'm a Jersey guy, and it's kind of close. I came up and visited the campus, liked what I saw, liked the coaching staff."

== College career ==
Dumas played college football at Syracuse from 2000 to 2003. In his first start as a weak-side linebacker, Dumas helped lead Syracuse to a victory over Temple when he intercepted a pass in the second quarter and returned it to the Temple 16-yard line to set up the go-ahead touchdown. Dumas recalled looking down as he bobbled the ball and prayed, "Lord, don't let me drop this ball." He also tallied seven tackles, including two tackles for loss, broke up a pass, and was awarded the game ball. In its reporting on the game, the Syracuse Herald American noted: "Encouraged by the interception, Dumas began to fly around the field making hits." His performance against Temple won Dumas a role as a starter.

As a sophomore in 2001, Dumas played in all 13 games, made 67 tackles and helped Syracuse to a 10–3 record.

As a junior in 2002, Dumas suffered a badly sprained ankle early in the season and injured his groin when he continued to play with the injury. Despite the injuries, Dumas recorded 92 tackles in 2002, as he developed into one of the better linebackers in the Big East Conference.

In January 2003, Dumas announced that he was leaving school for undisclosed reasons to return home to Roselle, New Jersey. Before he left, Syracuse coach Paul Pasqualoni told Dumas the door was open should he decide to return. In the summer of 2003, Dumas opted to return as fifth-year senior. At the time, he told the press, "Mentally, I was totally discombobulated. It was a big, total period of confusion. I knew I wasn't feeling good because I wasn't here with my brothers." In a feature story about Dumas, The Post-Standard covered his comeback.

As a senior in 2003, Dumas suffered a knee injury in the season opener against the University of North Carolina. The injury kept him out of the line-up for his entire senior year. In November 2003, sports writer Donnie Webb wrote a feature story on Dumas' hard-luck story. Webb wrote, "He is frustrated. He is exasperated. He is resigned to waiting out the storm. This is a four-year starter with aspirations and abilities to play in the NFL. His final audition is being played on the sidelines." Asked about being kept out of the line-up, Dumas said, "It's killing me." However, he insisted that he would not give up on his football career: "It's all about the love of the game. If you've got a strong love for something, it's always going to prevail. I went through too much stuff. The game keeps calling me."

In December 2003, Dumas petitioned the NCAA for a sixth year of eligibility after missing most of the 2003 season. Syracuse coach Paul Pasqualoni noted at the time, "He played only a very short period of time in the North Carolina game. So you'd say the NCAA would be sympathetic towards a sixth year. There is no precedents set for someone in Jameel's circumstances being granted. We're going to explore it. We're going to do everything we can do. The likelihood is, we'd be blazing new territory if we got it, and the likelihood of that happening is probably very slim." Dumas' request for an extra year of eligibility was denied.

Dumas finished his college football career at Syracuse with 179 tackles and earned All-America honors.

== Professional career ==
In 2005, Dumas played for the Albany Conquest in the AF2 arena football league. He had success as a two-way player for Albany playing at fullback on offense and linebacker on defense. Sports Illustrated pointed to Dumas as one of the AF2 players who "can recite a saga that purports to explain why he's playing in this quirky indoor league that's at least a Hail Mary from the NFL." The magazine noted that Dumas "was a star at Syracuse before blowing out his left knee." An earlier account on Dumas noted: "His speed is his greatest asset, and the injuries robbed him of it." In 2006, he was signed by the Rhein Fire of the NFL Europa. He played for the Rhein Fire in 2006 and for the Berlin Thunder in 2007.
