= Leo Disend =

American football player (1915–1985)

No. 27, 18
- Position: Tackle

Personal information
- Born: November 7, 1915; New York, New York, U.S.
- Died: May 13, 1985 (aged 69); Baldwin, New York, U.S.
- Listed height: 6 ft 2 in (1.88 m)
- Listed weight: 224 lb (102 kg)

Career information
- High school: Abraham Clark (New Jersey)
- College: Albright

Career history
- Brooklyn Dodgers (NFL) (1938–1939); Green Bay Packers (1940)

Career statistics
- Games played: 27
- Stats at Pro Football Reference

Leo Disend (November 7, 1915 – May 13, 1985) was a tackle in the National Football League.

== Biography ==
Disend was born on November 7, 1915, in New York City. Raised in Roselle, New Jersey, Disend played prep football at Abraham Clark High School.

== Career ==
Disend played with the Brooklyn Dodgers for two seasons before playing his final season with the Green Bay Packers. He played at college level at Albright College.
