= Reginald Atkins =

Member of the New Jersey General Assembly

The Reverend Reginald Atkins

Member of the New Jersey General Assembly from the 20th district
- In office January 11, 2022 – January 13, 2026 Serving with Annette Quijano
- Preceded by: Jamel Holley
- Succeeded by: Ed Rodriguez

Personal details
- Born: December 25, 1967 (age 58)
- Party: Democratic
- Website: Legislative webpage

Reginald Atkins (born December 25, 1967) is an American pastor and Democratic Party politician who represented the 20th Legislative District in the New Jersey General Assembly from 2022 to 2026.

Atkins served as president of the board of education of the Roselle Public Schools from 2007 to 2016. Elected to the Roselle borough council in 2016, he served as council president from 2018 to 2019, and was elected as mayor, serving from 2020 to 2021.

== New Jersey General Assembly ==
With Assemblyman Jamel Holley announcing in early 2021 that he would be mounting an ultimately unsuccessful primary challenge against Joseph Cryan for the seat from the 21st District in the New Jersey Senate, the Union County Democratic Party chose Atkins to run for the Assembly together with incumbent Annette Quijano. He took office in January 2022 as one of 17 newly elected members and the only ordained clergyman in the New Jersey Legislature.

After Atkins decided not running for re-election following the end of the county line, Ed Rodriguez won the primary for the second seat, defeating Sergio Granados by under 100 votes.

=== Committees ===
Committee assignments for the 2024—2025 Legislative Session are:

- Oversight, Reform and Federal Relations (as chair)
- Higher Education (as vice-chair)
- Aging and Human Services

=== District 20 ===
Each of the 40 districts in the New Jersey Legislature has one representative in the New Jersey Senate and two members in the New Jersey General Assembly. The representatives from the 20th District for the 2024—2025 Legislative Session are:

- Senator Joseph Cryan (D)
- Assemblyman Reginald Atkins (D)
- Assemblywoman Annette Quijano (D)

== Electoral history ==
20th Legislative District General Election, 2023
Party	Candidate	Votes	%
Democratic	Annette Quijano (incumbent)	12,280	42.7
Democratic	Reginald Atkins (incumbent)	12,104	42.1
Republican	Ramon Hernandez	4,380	15.2
Total votes		28,764	100.0
Democratic hold			
Democratic hold			

20th legislative district general election, 2021
Party	Candidate	Votes	%
Democratic	Annette Quijano (incumbent)	26,276	50.77%
Democratic	Reginald Atkins	25,477	49.23%
Total votes		51,753	100.0
Democratic hold			
