= Abraham Clark High School =

High school in Union County, New Jersey, US

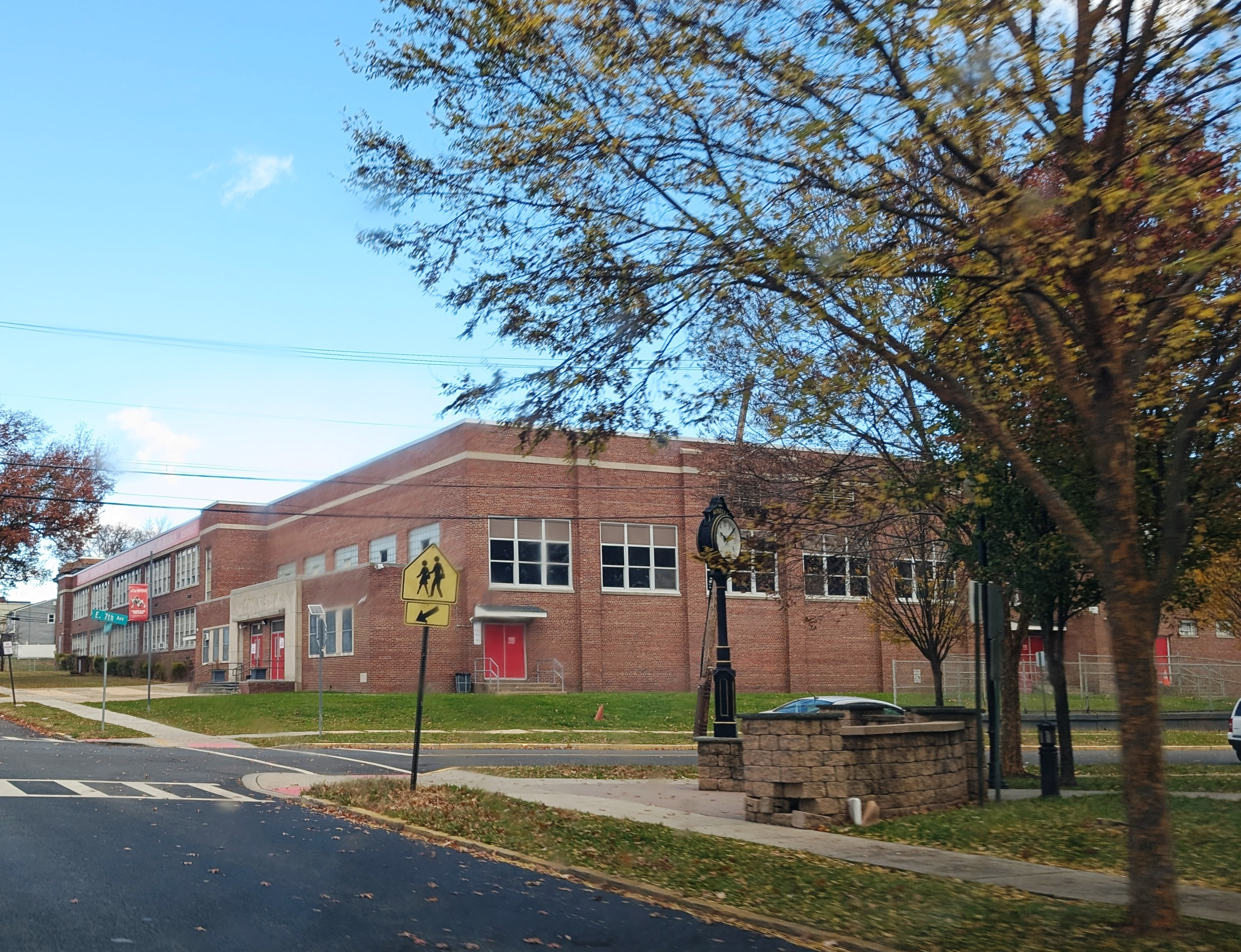

Location
- 122 East 6th Avenue; Roselle, Union County, New Jersey 07203; United States; 40.653866°N 74.261253°W

Information
- Type: Public high school
- School district: Roselle Public Schools
- NCES School ID: 341428005650
- Principal: Andreéa Harry (as of 2022-23)
- Faculty: 61.0 FTEs
- Grades: 9-12
- Enrollment: 926 (as of 2024–25)
- Student to teacher ratio: 15.2:1
- Colors: Red and Gray
- Athletics conference: Union County Interscholastic Athletic Conference (general); Big Central Football Conference (football)
- Team name: Rams
- Rival: Roselle Park High School
- Accreditation: Middle States Association of Colleges and Schools
- Publication: Rampage
- Newspaper: Rampage
- Website: www.roselleschools.org/achs/

Abraham Clark High School is a four-year comprehensive public high school that serves students in ninth through twelfth grade from the borough of Roselle, in Union County, in the U.S. state of New Jersey, operating as part of the Roselle Public Schools. The school has been accredited by the Middle States Association of Colleges and Schools Commission on Elementary and Secondary Schools since 1932 and is accredited until July 2025. The school is named for Abraham Clark, a Revolutionary War figure and signer of the Declaration of Independence.

As of the 2024–25 school year, the school had an enrollment of 926 students and 61.0 classroom teachers (on an FTE basis), for a student–teacher ratio of 15.2:1. There were 659 students (71.2% of enrollment) eligible for free lunch and 39 (4.2% of students) eligible for reduced-cost lunch.

== History ==
High school education in Roselle dates back to at least the late 19th century. A separate high school building was constructed in 1914, with an addition along East Sixth Avenue completed in 1929. The school was dedicated in honor of Abraham Clark in 1930. An addition along Chestnut Street was completed by January 1958, at which point the original 1914 structure was razed.

A 1950 study conducted in the early days of television examining the impact of watching TV on academic performance showed that the one-third of students who watch TV regularly had grades that were down 15% compared to those students who didn't watch TV, with a greater impact on the youngest students.

In 2010, the school was one of 12 in New Jersey to receive a School Improvement Grant from the United States Department of Education, under which the district was to be given $3.8 million over three years as part of a transformation plan that will lengthen the school day, update the curriculum with integrated technology and shift eighth graders out of the school beginning in September 2011.

== Awards, recognition and rankings ==
The school was the 306th-ranked public high school in New Jersey out of 339 schools statewide in New Jersey Monthly magazine's September 2014 cover story on the state's "Top Public High Schools", using a new ranking methodology. The school had been ranked 315th in the state out of 328 schools in 2012, after being ranked 272nd in 2010 out of 322 schools listed. The magazine ranked the school 283rd in 2008 out of 316 schools. The school was ranked 305th in the magazine's September 2006 issue, which surveyed 316 schools across the state.

== Athletics ==
The Abraham Clark High School Rams compete in the Union County Interscholastic Athletic Conference, which is comprised of public and private high schools in Union County and was established following a reorganization of sports leagues in Northern New Jersey by the New Jersey State Interscholastic Athletic Association (NJSIAA). Prior to the NJSIAA's 2010 realignment, the school had been part of the Mountain Valley Conference, which included public and private high schools in Essex and Union counties in northern New Jersey. With 548 students in grades 10-12, the school was classified by the NJSIAA for the 2019–20 school year as Group II for most athletic competition purposes, which included schools with an enrollment of 486 to 758 students in that grade range. The football team competes in Division 2B of the Big Central Football Conference, which includes 60 public and private high schools in Middlesex, Hunterdon, Somerset, Union and Warren counties, which are broken down into 10 divisions by size and location. The school was classified by the NJSIAA as Group II South for football for 2024–2026, which included schools with 514 to 685 students.

School colors are red and gray. Sports offered include golf (women), volleyball (women), golf (men), cross country (women), tennis (women), football, basketball (women), softball, cross country (men), soccer (men), basketball (men), track and field winter (men), baseball, track and field winter (women), track and field spring (women) and track and field spring (men).

The school has had a longstanding football rivalry with Roselle Park High School, which leads the series with an overall record of 51-40-8 through the 2017 season. NJ.com listed the rivalry as 31st best in their 2017 list "Ranking the 31 fiercest rivalries in N.J. HS football".

The boys basketball team won the Group II state championship in 1961 (defeating Moorestown High School in the tournament final), 1968 (vs. Union Hill High School), 1969 (vs. Union Hill), 1973 (vs. Gateway Regional High School), 1976 (vs. Pleasantville High School), 1984 (vs. Asbury Park High School), 1989 (vs. Haddonfield Memorial High School), 2003 (vs. Neptune High School), and won the Group I title in 1972 (vs. Wildwood High School), 1977 (vs. Glassboro High School), 1982 (vs. Bordentown Regional High School) and 1983 (vs. New Brunswick High School). The program's 11 state championships are tied for fourth-most in the state. A crowd of 3,000 watched as the 1961 team defeated Moorestown by a score of 86-54 in the Group II championship game, to finish the season at 26-0. Ahead by 12 points with four minutes left in the game, the 1976 team held off a late comeback from Pleasantville to win the Group II title with a 65-64 win in the championship game at Brookdale Community College. The 1977 team finished the season with a 27-1 record after defeating Glassboro by a score of 86-45 to win the Group I state championship. In 2003, the team came back from an early 17-point deficit to win the Group III title with a 54-53 against Neptune High School in the championship game. The 2008 team won the Central, Group II state sectional championship with a 72-63 win over Weequahic High School in the tournament final.

The 1989 football team finished the season with a 10-1 record after winning the North II Group II state sectional title with a 20-0 defeat of Madison High School in the championship game.

The boys track team won the indoor relay championship in Group I in 1995 and 2007.

The boys track team won the Group II spring / outdoor track state championship in 2008.

The boys track team won the indoor track championship in Group I in 2014.

== MCJROTC ==
ACHS is involved in the Marine Corps Junior Reserve Officers' Training Corps (JROTC) program. The school is one of five in the state to participate in the Marine Corps JROTC program.

== Administration ==
The school's principal is Andreéa Harry. Her core administration team includes three vice principals.

== Notable alumni ==
- Rabih Abdullah (born 1975), former running back who played for the Tampa Bay Buccaneers, Chicago Bears and New England Patriots during his seven-year NFL career
- Greg Cook (1958-2005), basketball player
- Leo Disend (1915–1985), tackle who played in the NFL for the Brooklyn Dodgers and Green Bay Packers
- Jameel Dumas (born 1981), football player for Syracuse University who played professionally in the AF2 and NFL Europa
- Rosey Grier (born 1932), former professional football player for the New York Giants and Los Angeles Rams, who is also an actor, author, and singer
- Jamel Holley (born 1979, class of 1997), politician who represented the 20th Legislative District in the New Jersey General Assembly from 2015 to 2022
- Jesse Holley (born 1984), signed by the Cincinnati Bengals as an undrafted free agent in 2007
- Kendall James (born 1991), cornerback who played in the NFL for the Detroit Lions
- James G. McLoughlin (1919–2014), recipient of an Air Medal, a Soldier's Medal and a Distinguished Flying Cross
- Emil Milan (born 1922), designer craftsman who worked primarily in wood.
- Barron Miles (born 1972), former professional defensive back who played for 12 seasons in the Canadian Football League
- Gene-Ann Polk (1926–2015), physician and hospital administrator
