= James G. McLoughlin =

American publisher (1919–2014)

- McLoughlin around 1943
- Born: October 17, 1919; Jersey City, New Jersey, U.S.
- Died: March 31, 2014 (aged 94); Brunswick, Maine, U.S.
- Burial place: Maine Veterans Memorial Cemetery, Augusta, Maine, U.S.
- Spouse(s): Jaqueline Mazak (divorced); Norma Frances Jannell (m. 1958–2014; his death)
- Military career
- Branch: United States Army Air Corps
- Service years: 1941–1945
- Rank: Staff sergeant
- Conflicts: World War II
- Awards: Distinguished Flying Cross; Air Medal; Soldier's Medal

James G. McLoughlin (October 17, 1919 – March 31, 2014) was an American publisher and serviceman. He served as a staff sergeant in the United States Army Air Corps in World War II, during which he received a Distinguished Flying Cross, an Air Medal and a Soldier's Medal.

== Early life ==
McLoughlin was born in 1919 in Jersey City, New Jersey, before moving to Roselle, New Jersey, in 1925. His mother was a native of Germany. He attended Abraham Clark High School. Prior to being enlisted in the United States Air Force, he attended college for two years, summering in Limerick, Maine.

== Career ==
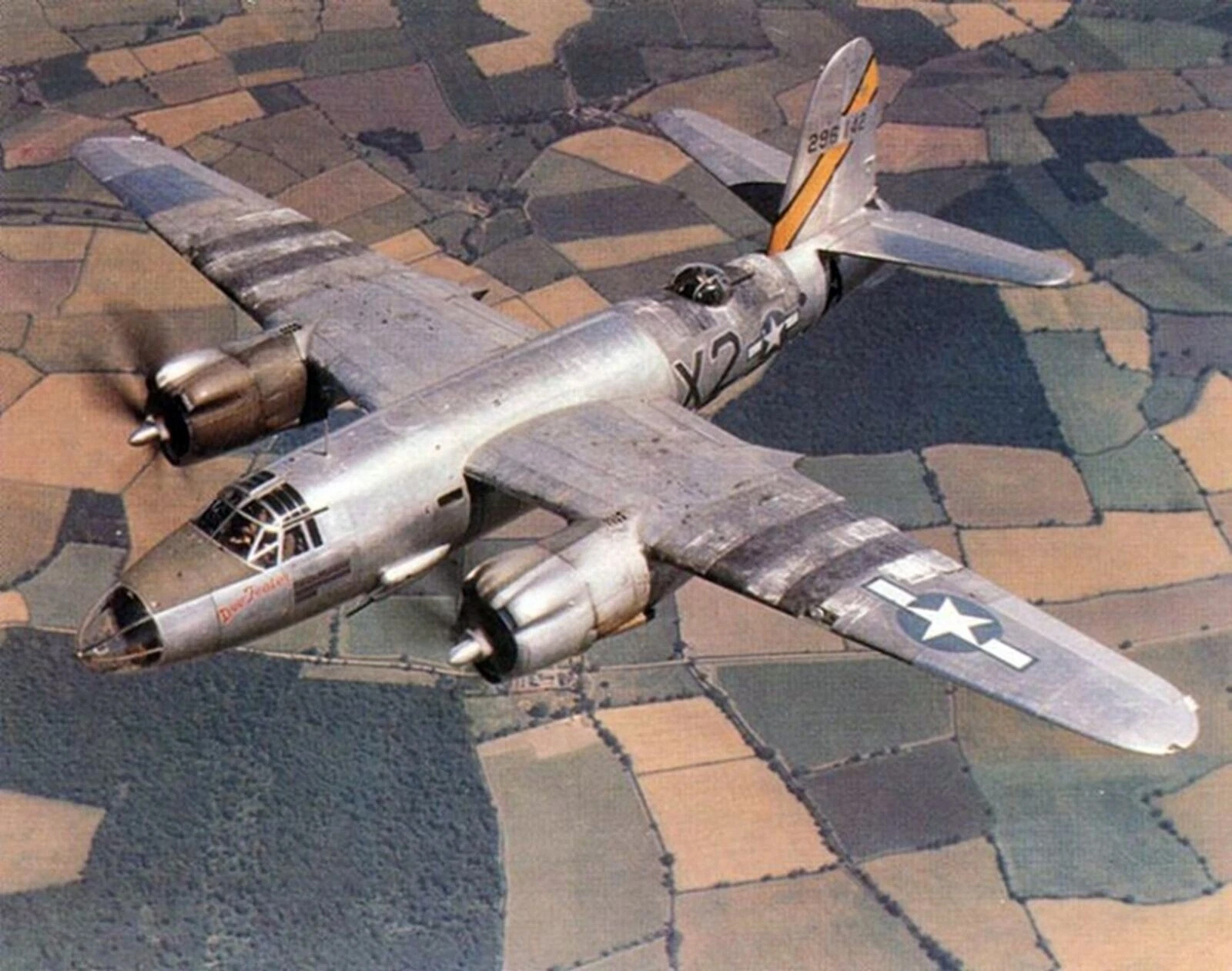
A Martin B-26 Marauder

During World War II, McLoughlin served as a staff sergeant with the 387th Bombardment Group and the 556th Bomb Squadron of the United States Army Air Corps' Ninth Air Force. A turret gunner on a Martin B-26 Marauder, he was based at RAF Chipping Ongar in Essex and flew 72 missions. He was awarded an Air Medal with twelve oak leaf clusters in 1944 and a Soldier's Medal in 1945. He also received a Distinguished Flying Cross.

Instead of finishing college, McLoughlin spent two years at the American Theatre Wing in New York.

== Personal life ==
In the late 1940s, McLoughin married Jaqueline Mazak (1924–2017), with whom he had a son, Terrence. The family was living in St. Petersburg, Florida. James and Jaqueline later divorced.

Between 1954 (when his father died) and 1958, McLoughlin lived in Portland, Maine, where he worked for Guy Gannett Communications. He also worked for McGraw Hill and spent a year traveling all over Maine for the company's technical publications.

In 1958, McLoughlin married Norma Frances Jannell, a native of Portland, whom he met at her church, where she sang in the choir. The couple moved to Nyack, New York, where James had a public-relations business. He formed the Foreign Press program for Maine governor John H. Reed. While living in Nyack, James and Norma had a son and a daughter together. In 1970, the McLoughlins returned to Maine, specifically Brunswick, where they established a publishing company, Harpswell Press. He also managed the communications of the state's Regional Medical Program, headed by Dr. Manu Chatterjee.

McLoughlin's son, Terrence, died in 2010, aged 64. John, his son with Norma, died in 2023, aged 60.

== Death ==
McLoughlin died at Mid Coast Hospital in Brunswick 2014, aged 94. He was interred in Maine Veterans Memorial Cemetery on Mount Vernon Road in Augusta, Maine. His wife died five months later and was buried next to him after her death, aged 84.
