= John F. Cryan =

American politician

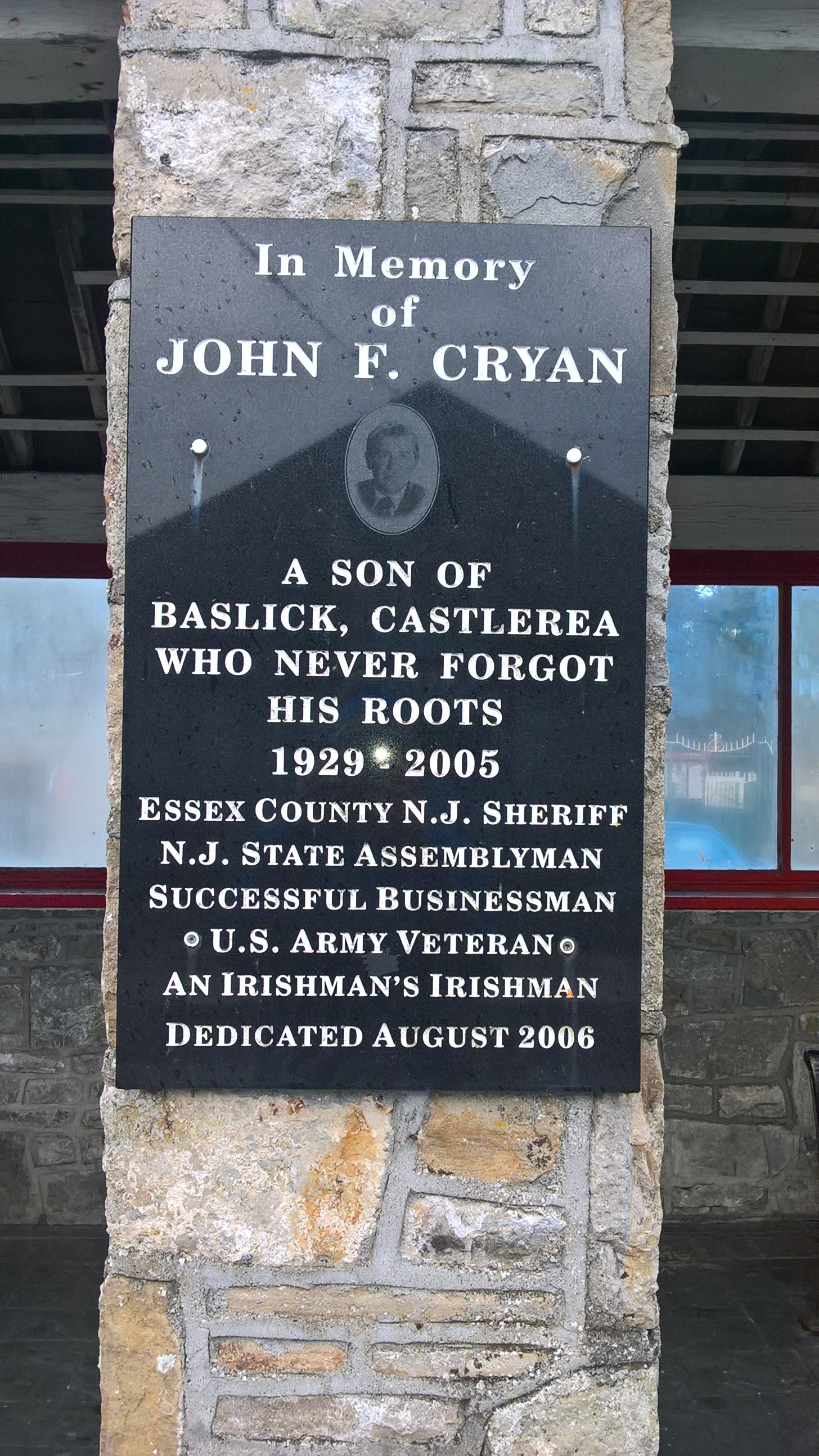
- Plaque in honour of John F. Cryan, Castlerea, Co. Roscommon

Sheriff of Essex County, New Jersey
- In office 1970–1979
- Preceded by: Ralph D'Ambola
- Succeeded by: Charles Cummings

Member of the New Jersey General Assembly from Essex County
- In office 1966–1967

Personal details
- Born: May 6, 1929 Baslick, Castlerea, County Roscommon, Ireland
- Died: February 6, 2005 (aged 75)
- Party: Democrat
- Spouse: Mary Ann Carr
- Children: 7, including Joseph Cryan

Military service
- Allegiance: United States
- Branch/service: United States Army
- Battles/wars: Korean War

John F. Cryan (May 6, 1929 – February 6, 2005) was an American Democratic Party politician who served as member of the New Jersey General Assembly and as the Sheriff of Essex County, New Jersey.

Cryan was born in Baslick, Castlerea, County Roscommon, and emigrated to the United States in 1948. He served in the U.S. Army during the Korean War. He worked at the Prudential Insurance Company in Newark and as a bus driver with Public Service Transport before opening a tavern in the Vailsburg section of Newark.

After serving as a Commissioner of the Newark Park Authority under Mayor Hugh Addonizio, Cryan ran for the New Jersey General Assembly in 1965. He did not seek re-election to a second term in 1967, instead becoming Essex County Undersheriff under Sheriff Ralph D'Ambola. When D'Ambola stepped down in 1970 after three terms, Cryan sought the post and won. He was re-elected in 1973 and 1976, but lost re-election in 1979 to Republican Charles Cummings.

In 1978, Cryan ran against, and lost to, Peter Shapiro in the June primary selecting the Democratic candidate for the first Essex County Executive, with Donald M. Payne coming in third.

John married Mary Ann Carr and they had seven children. His son, Joseph Cryan represents Union County in the New Jersey Senate, and served as Assembly Majority Leader and as Democratic State Chairman under Governor Jon Corzine.
