= Kendall James =

American football player (born 1992)

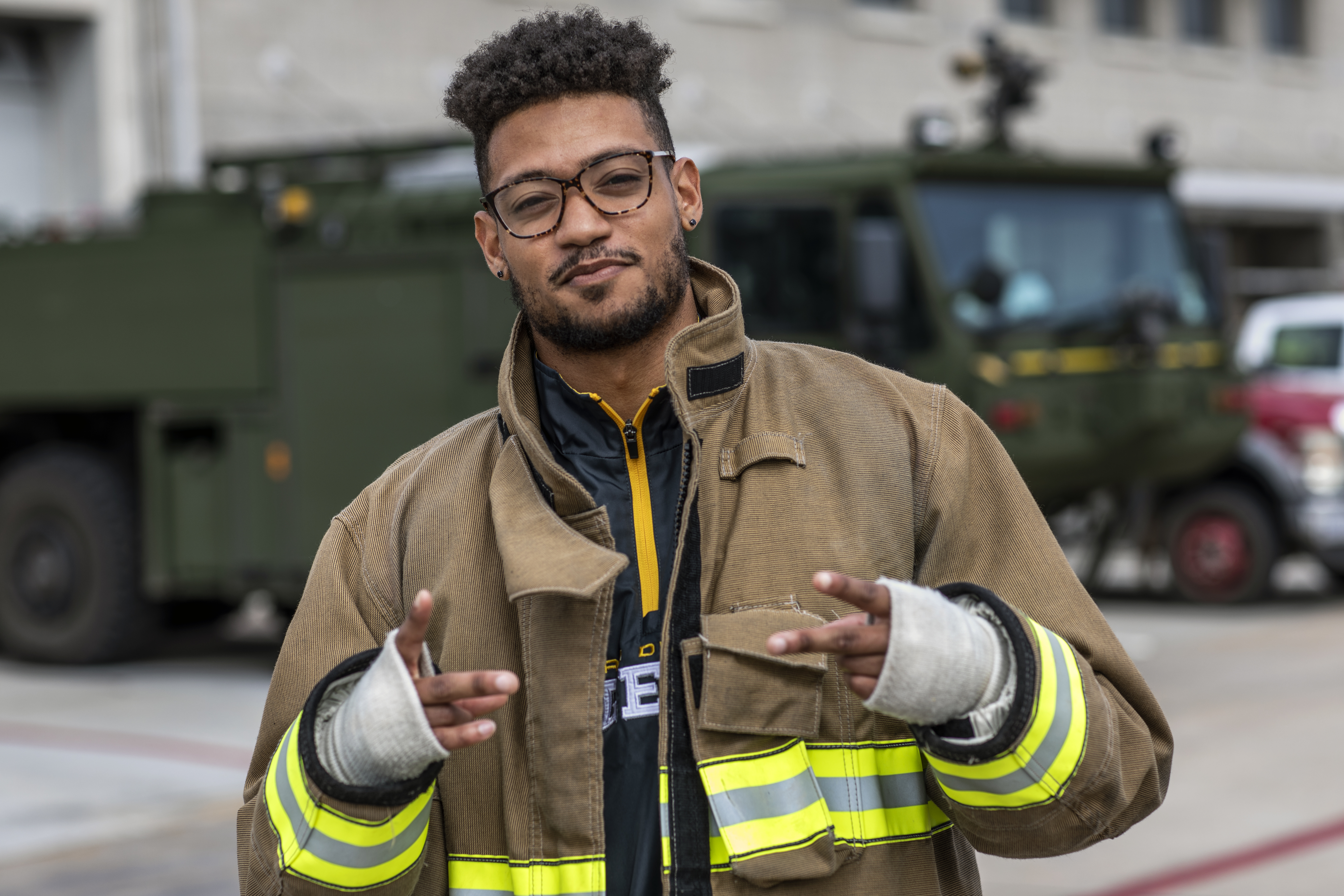
- James at MCAS Miramar in 2019

No. 37
- Position: Cornerback

Personal information
- Born: June 29, 1992 (age 34); Roselle, New Jersey, U.S.
- Listed height: 5 ft 11 in (1.80 m)
- Listed weight: 180 lb (82 kg)

Career information
- High school: Union County (Scotch Plains, New Jersey)
- College: Maine
- NFL draft: 2014: 6th round, 184th overall pick

Career history
- Minnesota Vikings (2014)*; Houston Texans (2014)*; San Diego Chargers (2014)*; Cleveland Browns (2014–2015)*; Detroit Lions (2015)*; New York Jets (2016)*; BC Lions (2017); San Diego Fleet (2019)
- * Offseason or practice squad member only

Awards and highlights
- Second-team FCS All-American (2013); First-team All-CAA (2013); Third-team All-CAA (2011)
- Stats at Pro Football Reference

Kendall James (born June 29, 1992) is an American former professional football player who was a cornerback in the National Football League (NFL). He was selected by the Minnesota Vikings in the sixth round of the 2014 NFL draft. He played college football for the Maine Black Bears.

== Early life ==
James attended the Union County Academy for Information Technology in Scotch Plains, New Jersey. While playing for Abraham Clark High School in Roselle, New Jersey, he earned all-conference and all-league honors during both his junior and senior seasons, and helped lead his team to its first winning record in 10 years in 2007. He set the school record with a 103-yard interception return for a touchdown. He also played basketball, where he was a three-year starter at point guard helping lead his team to a sectional championship during his junior season. He also ran track and helped lead his team to a state title his junior season.

He was considered a two-star recruit by Scout.com.

== College career ==
James attended the University of Maine, where he was a member of the Maine Black Bears football team from 2009 to 2013. During his career, he accumulated 136 tackles, nine interceptions, 25 pass break-ups and three forced fumbles. He earned All-Colonial Athletic Association honors twice; a third-team selection in 2011, and a first-team selection in 2013. He was also named a second-team FCS All-American by the Associated Press.

== Professional career ==
Pre-draft measurables
Height	Weight	40-yard dash	10-yard split	20-yard split	20-yard shuttle	Three-cone drill	Vertical jump	Broad jump	Bench press
5 ft 11 in (1.80 m)	180 lb (82 kg)	4.29 s	1.53 s	2.53 s	4.19 s	6.81 s	39 in (0.99 m)	10 ft 0 in (3.05 m)	9 reps
All values from the NFL Combine

James was selected by the Minnesota Vikings in the sixth round (184th overall) of the 2014 NFL draft. On May 16, 2014, he signed his rookie contract with the Vikings. On August 30, 2014, he was released by the Vikings. On the following day, James cleared waivers and was signed to the Vikings' practice squad. On September 2, 2014, James was released.

James was signed to the practice squad of the Houston Texans on October 1, 2014. He was released on October 28, 2014.

James was signed to the practice squad of the San Diego Chargers on October 30, 2014. He was released on December 8, 2014.

On December 9, 2014, James was signed to the Cleveland Browns' practice squad. On September 5, 2015, he was waived by the Browns. On the following day, he cleared waivers and was signed to the practice squad.

James was signed to the practice squad of the Detroit Lions on December 15, 2015.

James was signed to a reserve/future contract by the New York Jets on January 8, 2016. James was waived/injured on August 11, 2016, after being placed on the physically unable to perform list at the start of training camp.

James signed with the BC Lions of the Canadian Football League on September 4, 2017. He played in two games, both starts, for the Lions in 2017, recording seven tackles on defense and one pass breakup. He was released on June 9, 2018.

On October 26, 2018, James signed with the San Diego Fleet of the Alliance of American Football. He played in eight games, starting seven, for the Fleet in 2019, totaling 31 solo tackles and five assisted tackles. The league ceased operations in April 2019.
