= T. Parker Smith =

American business academic (died 1937)

Theodore Parker Smith (April 1855 – August 12, 1937) was a leader at business colleges in the U.S. He ran Smith's Business College in Lynchburg, Virginia.

== Early life ==
Smith was a Missouri native, graduated from Lincoln University (Pennsylvania) in 1888 and married Clara Alexander of Lynchburg.

== Career ==
An 1899 advertisement in the Richmond Planet announced that the school offered courses in “phonographic, penning, commercial, English…”, and a 1908 publication lauded Smith as “one of the pioneers” in the work of training African Americans in business principles.

By 1897, he was a professor at a business college in Lynchburg, Virginia. He later served as president and manager of Smith's Business College in Lynchburg where he taught stenography and bookkeeping. In 1910, Smith left that position to join the faculty of the National Religious Training School (a predecessor of North Carolina Central University).

By 1911 they had moved to Durham, North Carolina, where he was the Dean of the Commercial Department at the school. Clara served as the head of the Teacher's Department. He taught at the North Carolina State Summer School for Negro Teachers.

They later moved to Kansas City, Missouri and in August 1933 Smith was hit in the hip by a stray bullet shot by fleeing bank robbers. By 1934, Smith was operating a new Smith's Business College in Kansas City, Missouri.

== Personal life ==
Smith's children included Myra Lyle Smith Kearse, who in turn was the mother of Amalya Lyle Kearse.

Smith died on August 12, 1937, at General Hospital No. 2 in Kansas City. He was buried in Highland Cemetery in Kansas City.
