= Amalya Kearse =

American judge (born 1937)

Senior Judge of the United States Court of Appeals for the Second Circuit
- Incumbent
- Assumed office June 11, 2002

Judge of the United States Court of Appeals for the Second Circuit
- In office June 21, 1979 – June 11, 2002
- Appointed by: Jimmy Carter
- Preceded by: Seat established
- Succeeded by: Reena Raggi

Personal details
- Born: Amalya Lyle Kearse; June 11, 1937 (age 88) Vauxhall, New Jersey, U.S.
- Party: Republican
- Relatives: Myra Smith Kearse (mother); T. Parker Smith (grandfather)
- Education: Wellesley College (BA); University of Michigan (JD)

Amalya Lyle Kearse (born June 11, 1937) is an American lawyer and judge. She is a senior United States circuit judge of the United States Court of Appeals for the Second Circuit, having been appointed to the court in 1979 and assuming senior status in 2002. She is also a world-class bridge player.

== Education and legal career ==
Kearse was born in Vauxhall, New Jersey to physician Dr. Myra Lyle Smith Kearse of Lynchburg, Virginia, and postmaster Robert Freeman Kearse; her maternal grandparents were schoolteachers Clara Roberta Alexander Smith and Theodore Parker Smith. She attended Columbia High School in Maplewood, New Jersey. A philosophy major and 1959 graduate of Wellesley College with a Bachelor of Arts degree, she was the only black woman in her law school class at the University of Michigan Law School. She was an editor of the law review and graduated with a Juris Doctor cum laude in 1962. She entered private practice in New York City and rose to become a partner in the respected Wall Street firm of Hughes Hubbard & Reed. She was an adjunct lecturer at New York University Law School from 1968 to 1969.

=== Federal judicial service ===
Kearse was nominated by President Jimmy Carter on May 3, 1979, to the United States Court of Appeals for the Second Circuit, to a new seat authorized by 92 Stat. 1629. She was confirmed by the United States Senate on June 19, 1979, and received her commission on June 21, 1979. At the time, she was the first woman and only the second black person (after Thurgood Marshall) on the court. She assumed senior status on June 11, 2002.

Kearse was the author of the 1984 decision McCray v. Abrams, a case in which she developed a test that made it much harder for jurors to be struck because of their race. The Supreme Court would develop a test similar to Kearse's in Batson v. Kentucky.

=== Supreme Court shortlist ===
Kearse was considered a potential Supreme Court candidate almost immediately upon her confirmation to the Second Circuit, first as a potential nominee for President Jimmy Carter. In 1981, Kearse became the first African-American woman to be shortlisted for an appointment as an Associate Justice of the Supreme Court of the United States; President Ronald Reagan eventually nominated Judge Sandra Day O'Connor of the Arizona Court of Appeals for the position instead. In 1993, Kearse was considered a listed as a potential Supreme Court nominee for President Bill Clinton.

=== Consideration for United States attorney general ===
In 1993, Kearse was considered by President Bill Clinton for appointment as United States Attorney General; the job eventually went to Janet Reno.

== Bridge career ==
Kearse is also known as a world-class bridge player. In 1986, playing with longtime partner Jacqui Mitchell, she won the World Women Pairs Championship, which earned her the title of World Bridge Federation World Life Master. She is also a seven-time U.S. national champion of the game.

=== Honors ===
- ACBL Hall of Fame, Blackwood Award 2004

=== Awards ===
- Charles H. Goren Award (Personality of the Year) 1980

=== Wins ===
- World Women's Pairs (1) 1986
- North American Bridge Championships (6)
  - Women's Board-a-Match Teams (1) 1990
  - Women's Knockout Teams (1) 1987
  - Women's Swiss Teams (1) 1991
  - Life Master Women's Pairs (1) 1972
  - Women's Pairs (2) 1971, 2004
- United States Bridge Championships (1)
  - Women's Team Trials (1) 1992

=== Runners-up ===
- North American Bridge Championships (3)
  - Mixed Board-a-Match Teams (1) 1996
  - Women's Knockout Teams (1) 1991
  - Women's Swiss Teams (1) 2001
- United States Bridge Championships (3)
  - Women's Team Trials (3) 1988, 1995, 2004
- Other notable 2nd places:
  - IOC Grand Prix Women's Teams (1) 2002

=== Publications ===
- — (1990). Bridge Convention Complete (Revised and Expanded ed.). Louisville, KY: Devyn Press, Inc. p. 1121. ISBN 0-910791-76-7.

== See also ==
- Bill Clinton Supreme Court candidates
- List of African-American federal judges
- List of African-American jurists
- List of first women lawyers and judges in the United States
- List of United States federal judges by longevity of service

Legal offices
New seat	Judge of the United States Court of Appeals for the Second Circuit; 1979–2002	Succeeded by Reena Raggi
