= Vauxhall, New Jersey =

Populated place in Union County, New Jersey, US

- Census-designated place
- Location in Union County Location in New Jersey Location in the United States
- Coordinates: 40°43′06″N 74°17′03″W
- Country: United States
- State: New Jersey
- County: Union
- Township: Union

Area
  - Total: 0.59 sq mi (1.52 km^{2})
  - Land: 0.59 sq mi (1.52 km^{2})
  - Water: 0 sq mi (0.00 km^{2})
- Elevation: 190 ft (58 m)

Population (2020)
  - Total: 5,251
  - Density: 8,919.3/sq mi (3,443.77/km^{2})
- ZIP Code: 07088
- FIPS code: 34-75590
- GNIS feature ID: 0881436

Vauxhall is an unincorporated community and census-designated place (CDP) located within Union Township in Union County, in the U.S. state of New Jersey. Vauxhall borders Millburn, Maplewood and Springfield. The area is served as United States Postal Service ZIP Code 07088.

As of the 2020 census, Vauxhall had a population of 5,251.

Vauxhall is home to The Home Depot Superstore, that at 217,000 square feet (20,200 m^{2}) was the chain's largest store in the world as of 2012.

== Demographics ==
Historical population
Census	Pop.	Note	%±
2020	5,251		—
U.S. Decennial Census

Vauxhall first appeared as a census designated place in the 2020 U.S. census.

=== 2020 census ===
As of the 2020 census, Vauxhall had a population of 5,251. The median age was 39.5 years. 21.8% of residents were under the age of 18 and 16.1% were 65 years of age or older. For every 100 females there were 84.8 males, and for every 100 females age 18 and over there were 79.6 males age 18 and over.

100.0% of residents lived in urban areas, while 0.0% lived in rural areas.

There were 1,823 households, of which 34.7% had children under the age of 18 living in them. Of all households, 33.6% were married-couple households, 18.0% were households with a male householder and no spouse or partner present, and 42.0% were households with a female householder and no spouse or partner present. About 26.4% of all households were made up of individuals, and 11.3% had someone living alone who was 65 years of age or older.

There were 1,933 housing units, of which 5.7% were vacant. The homeowner vacancy rate was 0.9% and the rental vacancy rate was 3.1%.

Vauxhall CDP, New Jersey – Racial and ethnic composition Note: the US Census treats Hispanic/Latino as an ethnic category. This table excludes Latinos from the racial categories and assigns them to a separate category. Hispanics/Latinos may be of any race.
Race / Ethnicity (NH = Non-Hispanic)	Pop 2020	% 2020
White alone (NH)	354	6.74%
Black or African American alone (NH)	3,825	72.84%
Native American or Alaska Native alone (NH)	12	0.23%
Asian alone (NH)	165	3.14%
Native Hawaiian or Pacific Islander alone (NH)	0	0.00%
Other race alone (NH)	57	1.09%
Mixed race or Multiracial (NH)	147	2.80%
Hispanic or Latino (any race)	691	13.16%
Total	5,251	100.00%

== Notable people ==
People who were born in, residents of, or otherwise closely associated with Vauxhall include:

- Nija Charles (born 1997), singer-songwriter and record producer.
- Amalya Lyle Kearse (born 1937), a judge of the United States Court of Appeals for the Second Circuit.
- Myra Smith Kearse (1899–1982), physician and community leader and mother of Amalya Lyle Kearse.
- Elliott Maddox (born 1947), former professional baseball player who played for both the New York Mets and New York Yankees.
- Lawrence E. Roberts (1922–2004), pilot with the Tuskegee Airmen and a colonel in the United States Air Force.
