= Annette Quijano =

Member of the New Jersey General Assembly

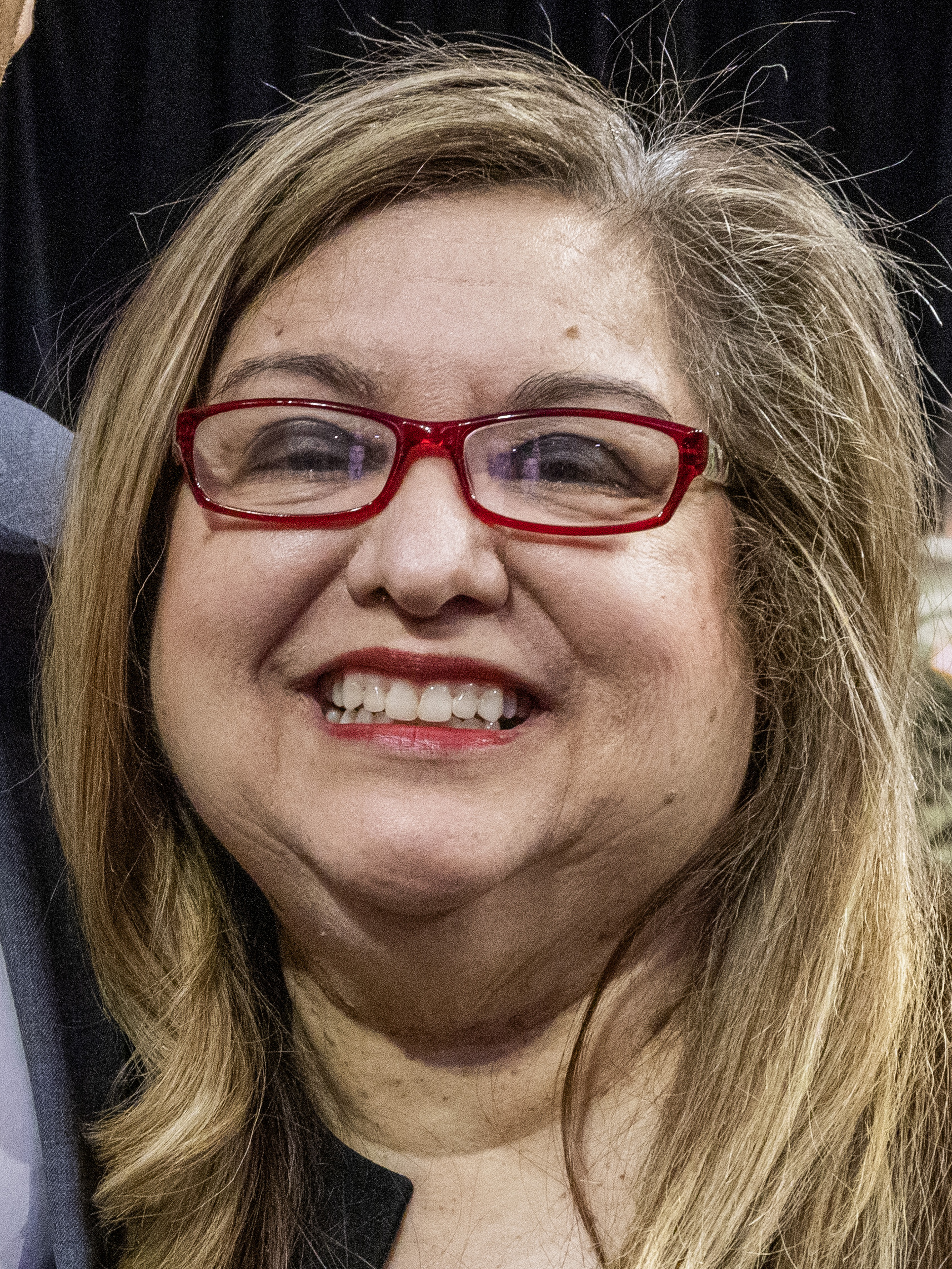
- Quijano in 2025

Speaker pro tempore of the New Jersey General Assembly
- Incumbent
- Assumed office January 30, 2025
- Preceded by: Benjie Wimberly

Member of the New Jersey General Assembly from the 20th district
- Incumbent
- Assumed office September 25, 2008 Serving with Ed Rodriguez
- Preceded by: Neil M. Cohen

Personal details
- Born: July 4, 1962 (age 64) Elizabeth, New Jersey, U.S.
- Party: Democratic
- Education: Rutgers University, Camden (BS); Rutgers University, Newark (JD)
- Website: State Assembly website

Annette M. Quijano (/kiˈhɑːnoʊ/, born July 4, 1962) is an American Democratic Party politician, who has represented the 20th Legislative District in the New Jersey General Assembly since September 25, 2008.

== Early life ==
Quijano is a native of New Jersey, the daughter of Puerto Rican parents. She is a resident of Elizabeth.

Quijano graduated from Rutgers University with a B.S. in Management and earned her Juris Doctor from Rutgers School of Law–Newark in 1991. She served clerkships at New Jersey Superior Court in Newark, and in Trenton at both the Office of the Governor's Counsel and the New Jersey Department of the Public Advocate in Trenton. She has bar admissions in both New Jersey and Pennsylvania. She is currently a municipal prosecutor for the City of Elizabeth. She has worked as a Compliance Manager for Prudential/ Aetna U.S. Healthcare and as an attorney in civil practice. She served as Chief of Staff to State Senator Raymond Lesniak from 1992 to 1994, Assistant Counsel to Union County, Clerk to the Union County Board of Chosen Freeholders and as the Assistant Counsel to Governors Jim McGreevey, Richard Codey and Jon Corzine. Quijano has served on the United Way Hispanic Advisory Council of Union County, the Governor's Working Group for Hispanic Affairs, a Legal Services committee in Elizabeth, and as a Commissioner for New Jersey's Congressional Redistricting efforts. She is the recipient of the Excellence in State Government Leadership and the Women of Excellence in Government awards and mentors young adults to consider law and graduate school in her free time.

== New Jersey Assembly ==
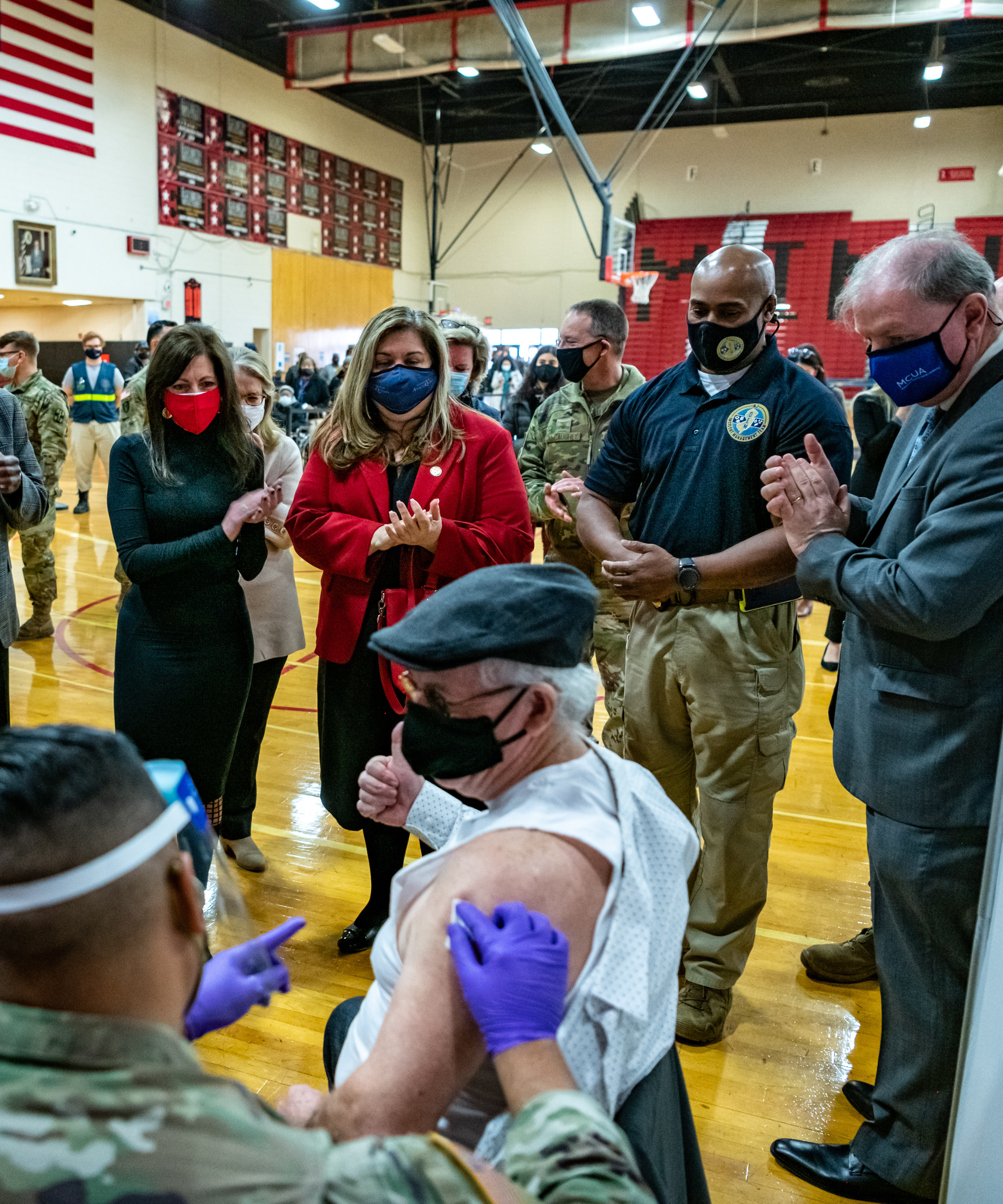
Quijano (second from left) attends a COVID-19 vaccination event held by FEMA in 2020.

Quijano is the first woman and first minority to represent the 20th District. Quijano was selected by a convention of Union County Democrats over Patricia Perkins-Auguste by a vote of 87–82 to replace the vacant seat of Neil Cohen who resigned. Cohen resigned after staffers for then Assemblyman Joseph Cryan and then Senator Raymond Lesniak found child pornography on Cohen's computer. She was sworn in on September 25, 2008. She has been serving as General Assembly Deputy Majority Leader and Chairwoman of the Assembly Homeland Security and State Preparedness Committee. This is in addition to serving as a member of the Labor Committee. In June 2017, Quijano introduced a bill to designate Streptomyces griseus as New Jersey's State Microbe, to be added to the state's other state symbols. S. griseus was chosen for this honor because it is a New Jersey native that made unique contributions to healthcare and scientific research worldwide. A strain of S. griseus that produced the antibiotic streptomycin was discovered in New Jersey in 1916 and developed into an antibiotic by a Rutgers University team by Albert Schatz and Selman Waksman in 1943. A companion bill was introduced in the Senate in May 2017 by Samuel D. Thompson.

In January 2025, Quijano was elected as speaker pro tempore, replacing Benjie Wimberly who was appointed to the State Senate.

=== Committees ===
Committee assignments for the 2024—2025 Legislative Session are:

- Consumer Affairs (as vice-chair)
- Housing
- Labor

=== District 20 ===
Each of the 40 districts in the New Jersey Legislature has one representative in the New Jersey Senate and two members in the New Jersey General Assembly. The representatives from the 20th District for the 2024—2025 Legislative Session are:

- Senator Joseph Cryan (D)
- Assemblyman Reginald Atkins (D)
- Assemblywoman Annette Quijano (D)

== Electoral history ==
=== New Jersey Assembly ===
20th Legislative District General Election, 2023
Party	Candidate	Votes	%
Democratic	Annette Quijano (incumbent)	12,280	42.7
Democratic	Reginald Atkins (incumbent)	12,104	42.1
Republican	Ramon Hernandez	4,380	15.2
Total votes		28,764	100.0
Democratic hold			
Democratic hold			

20th legislative district general election, 2021
Party	Candidate	Votes	%
Democratic	Annette Quijano (incumbent)	26,276	50.77%
Democratic	Reginald Atkins	25,477	49.23%
Total votes		51,753	100.0
Democratic hold			

New Jersey general election, 2019
Party	Candidate	Votes	%	±%
Democratic	Annette Quijano (Incumbent)	13,173	40.75	▼4.65
Democratic	Jamel Holley (Incumbent)	12,437	38.48	▼6.12
Republican	Charles Donnelly	3,496	10.82	▲0.82
Republican	Ashraf Hanna	3,218	9.96	▲9.96
Total votes		'53,372'	'100.0'	

New Jersey general election, 2017
Party	Candidate	Votes	%	±%
Democratic	Annette Quijano (Incumbent)	24,221	45.4	▲6.0
Democratic	Jamel Holley (Incumbent)	23,790	44.6	▲6.8
Republican	Joseph G. Aubourg	5,361	10.0	▼1.7
Total votes		'53,372'	'100.0'	

New Jersey general election, 2015
Party	Candidate	Votes	%	±%
Democratic	Annette Quijano (Incumbent)	12,061	39.4	▲3.9
Democratic	Jamel Holley (Incumbent)	11,568	37.8	▲1.5
Republican	Stephen E. Kozlovich	3,593	11.7	▼2.8
Republican	Roger Stryeski	3,398	11.1	▼2.6
Total votes		30,620	100.0	

New Jersey general election, 2013
Party	Candidate	Votes	%	±%
Democratic	Joseph Cryan (Incumbent)	19,268	36.3	▼6.1
Democratic	Annette Quijano (Incumbent)	18,839	35.5	▼7.2
Republican	Charles Donnelly	7,719	14.5	▼0.1
Republican	Christopher Hackett	7,269	13.7	N/A
Total votes		'53,095'	'100.0'	

New Jersey general election, 2011
Party	Candidate	Votes	%
Democratic	Annette Quijano (Incumbent)	12,116	42.7
Democratic	Joseph Cryan (Incumbent)	12,104	42.7
Republican	John F. Donoso	4,128	14.6
Total votes		28,348	100.0

New Jersey general election, 2009
Party	Candidate	Votes	%	±%
Democratic	Joseph Cryan (Incumbent)	20,607	50.7	▲15.5
Democratic	Annette Quijano (Incumbent)	20,054	49.3	▲12.6
Total votes		'40,661'	'100.0'	

Special election, November 4, 2008
Party	Candidate	Votes	%
Democratic	Annette Quijano (Incumbent)	35,746	71.2
Republican	Linda Gaglione	14,458	28.8
Total votes		50,204	100.0

New Jersey General Assembly
Preceded by Benjie Wimberly	Speaker pro tempore of the New Jersey General Assembly; 2025–present	Incumbent
