= Joseph Cryan =

American politician (born 1961)

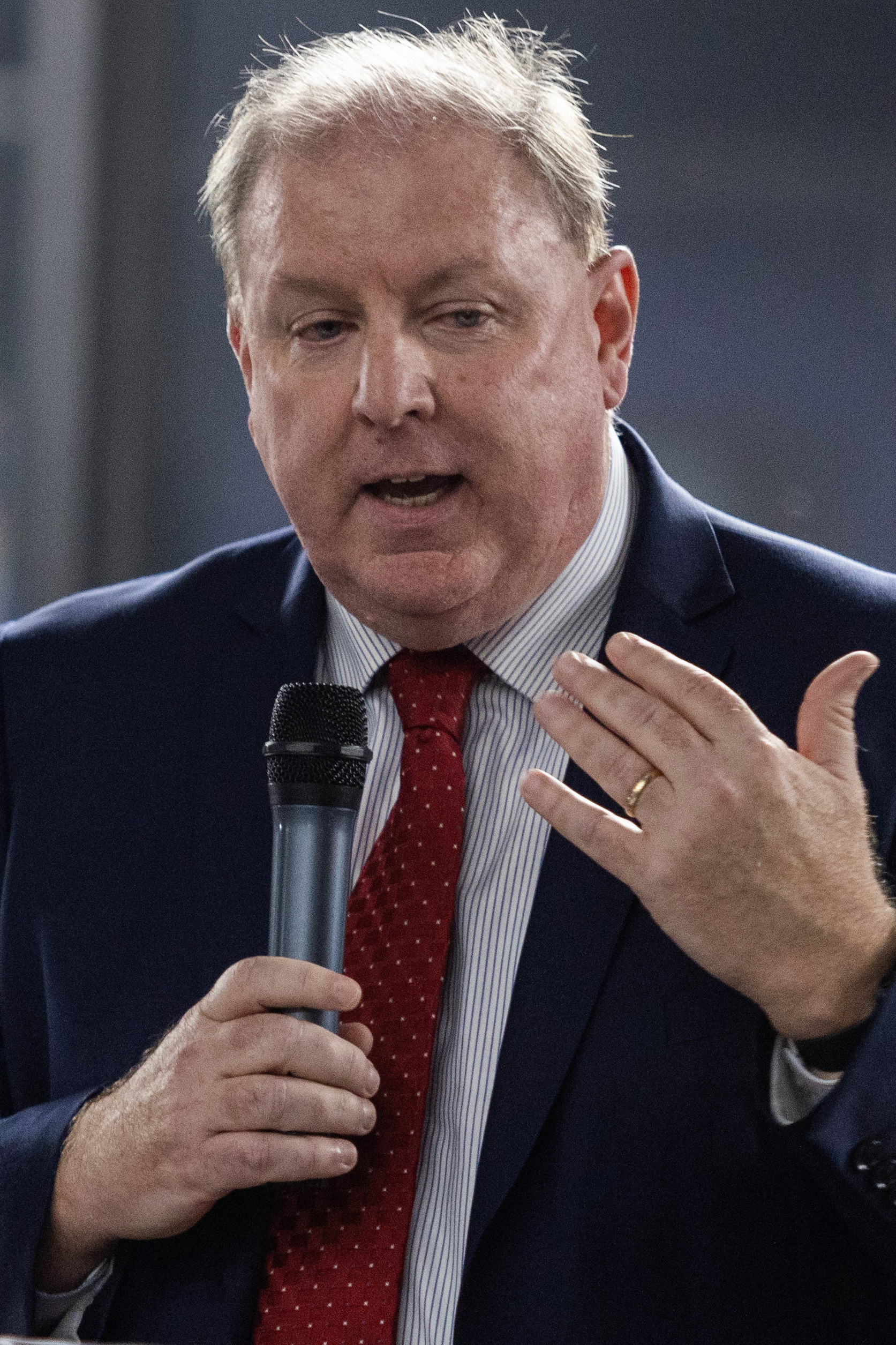

Member of the New Jersey Senate from the 20th district
- Incumbent
- Assumed office January 9, 2018
- Preceded by: Raymond Lesniak

Majority Leader of the New Jersey General Assembly
- In office January 12, 2010 – January 10, 2012
- Preceded by: Bonnie Watson Coleman
- Succeeded by: Louis Greenwald

Member of the New Jersey General Assembly from the 20th district
- In office January 8, 2002 – January 4, 2015 Serving with Neil M. Cohen, Annette Quijano
- Preceded by: Joseph Suliga
- Succeeded by: Jamel Holley

Chair of the New Jersey Democratic Party
- In office February 17, 2006 – January 27, 2010
- Preceded by: Bonnie Watson Coleman
- Succeeded by: John Wisniewski

Personal details
- Born: September 1, 1961 (age 65) East Orange, New Jersey, U.S.
- Party: Democratic
- Relations: John F. Cryan (father); John Cryan (cousin)
- Education: Belmont Abbey College (BA)
- Website: State Senate website

Joseph P. Cryan (born September 1, 1961) is an American Democratic Party politician who has served in the New Jersey Senate since 2018, representing the 20th Legislative District. He previously served in the New Jersey General Assembly from 2002 to 2015, where he also represented the 20th Legislative District.

== New Jersey Assembly ==
Cryan was the Majority Leader of the New Jersey General Assembly, serving from January 12, 2010, until January 10, 2012. Cryan served as the Assembly's Deputy Majority Leader 2006–2010, and was Assistant Majority Leader from 2004 to 2005. He served on the Human Services Committee and the Law and Public Safety Committee.

== New Jersey Senate ==
Cryan ran for New Jersey Senate in 2017, and won. Cryan was sworn in on January 9, 2018.

Assemblymember Jamel Holley announced in January 2021 that he would challenge Cryan in the June 2021 primaries. Jason Krychiw also ran against Cryan in the primary.

=== Committees ===
Committee assignments for the 2024—2025 Legislative Session are:

- Higher Education (as chair)
- Commerce (as vice-chair)

=== District 20 ===
Each of the 40 districts in the New Jersey Legislature has one representative in the New Jersey Senate and two members in the New Jersey General Assembly. The representatives from the 20th District for the 2024—2025 Legislative Session are:

- Senator Joseph Cryan (D)
- Assemblyman Reginald Atkins (D)
- Assemblywoman Annette Quijano (D)

== Personal ==
Cryan was born on September 1, 1961, in East Orange and raised Roman Catholic. His father, John F. Cryan, an immigrant from Castlerae, County Roscommon, Ireland, was elected to the General Assembly and served as Sheriff of Essex County.

Cryan's father had been charged in Federal court with racketeering and corruption, though the judge in the case dismissed the charges due to prosecutorial misconduct and ended the proceedings against him.

Like his father the younger Cryan has remained a stalwart in the New Jersey Irish-American community, especially in Essex and Union Counties. Cryan remains the standard bearer of the John F. Cryan Association, the organization started by his father dedicated to honoring Irish heritage, serving the local community, and supporting charitable causes. He was also a founding member of the Union County St. Patrick's Day Parade. He was the first General Chairperson in 1997 and in 2023 was named Grand Marshal. The parade is held ever year on the saturday before St. Patrick's Day on Morris Ave in Union Township.

The lawmaker's son, also named John Cryan, was convicted of brutally beating a motorist with a baseball bat while two accomplices punched and kicked the victim, after a case of road rage that occurred when his father was in the General Assembly. The younger Cryan was ordered by the court only to probation but he was later jailed for violating the terms of his sentence.

Other relatives involved in public life are his cousin, Morristown Councilman John Cryan, his sister, Union Township Municipal Clerk Eileen Birch, his cousin, Cranford, New Jersey township administrator Jamie Cryan, his brother-in-law Superior Court judge Joseph Donohue.

Cryan graduated with a B.A. from Belmont Abbey College in Business Administration in 1983. Cryan was born in East Orange, and currently resides in Union Township.

== Democratic state chairman ==
Cryan has served on the New Jersey State Democratic Committee since 2002, as Vice Chair. On February 17, 2006, Cryan was selected to be the head of the New Jersey Democratic State Committee, succeeding Bonnie Watson Coleman. He stepped down after the selection of his successor John S. Wisniewski on January 27, 2010. As Democratic state chairman, in November 2009, Assemblyman Cryan presided over a Democratic gubernatorial party loss by incumbent Jon Corzine to Republican Chris Christie. He was replaced as state chairman in January 2010 by Assemblyman John Wisniewski.

== Electoral history ==
=== New Jersey Senate ===
20th Legislative District General Election, 2023
| Party | Candidate | Votes | % |
|---|---|---|---|
| Democratic | Joseph Cryan (incumbent) | 12,473 | 74.7 |
| Republican | Carmen Bucco | 4,224 | 25.3 |
| Total votes | | 16,697 | 100.0 |
| Democratic hold | | | |

20th Legislative District general election, 2021
| Party | Candidate | Votes | % |
|---|---|---|---|
| Democratic | Joseph Cryan (incumbent) | 26,603 | 100.0 |
| Total votes | | 26,603 | 100.0 |
| Democratic hold | | | |

New Jersey general election, 2017
| Party | Candidate | Votes | % | ±% |
|---|---|---|---|---|
| Democratic | Joseph Cryan | 25,772 | 83.7 | ▼16.3 |
| Republican | Ashraf Hanna | 5,023 | 16.3 | N/A |
| Total votes | | '30,795' | '100.0' | |

=== New Jersey Assembly ===
New Jersey general election, 2013
| Party | Candidate | Votes | % | ±% |
|---|---|---|---|---|
| Democratic | Joseph Cryan (Incumbent) | 19,268 | 36.3 | ▼6.1 |
| Democratic | Annette Quijano (Incumbent) | 18,839 | 35.5 | ▼7.2 |
| Republican | Charles Donnelly | 7,719 | 14.5 | ▼0.1 |
| Republican | Christopher Hackett | 7,269 | 13.7 | N/A |
| Total votes | | '53,095' | '100.0' | |

New Jersey general election, 2011
| Party | Candidate | Votes | % |
|---|---|---|---|
| Democratic | Annette Quijano (Incumbent) | 12,116 | 42.7 |
| Democratic | Joseph Cryan (Incumbent) | 12,104 | 42.7 |
| Republican | John F. Donoso | 4,128 | 14.6 |
| Total votes | | 28,348 | 100.0 |

New Jersey general election, 2009
| Party | Candidate | Votes | % | ±% |
|---|---|---|---|---|
| Democratic | Joseph Cryan (Incumbent) | 20,607 | 50.7 | ▲15.5 |
| Democratic | Annette Quijano (Incumbent) | 20,054 | 49.3 | ▲12.6 |
| Total votes | | '40,661' | '100.0' | |

New Jersey general election, 2007
| Party | Candidate | Votes | % | ±% |
|---|---|---|---|---|
| Democratic | Neil M. Cohen (Incumbent) | 10,000 | 36.7 | ▼13.6 |
| Democratic | Joseph Cryan (Incumbent) | 9,583 | 35.2 | ▼14.5 |
| Clean Up Government | Marlene J. Abitanto | 3,858 | 14.2 | N/A |
| Clean Up Government | Lester Dominguez | 3,810 | 14.0 | N/A |
| Total votes | | '27,251' | '100.0' | |

New Jersey general election, 2005
| Party | Candidate | Votes | % | ±% |
|---|---|---|---|---|
| Democratic | Neil M. Cohen (Incumbent) | 23,668 | 50.3 | ▲18.9 |
| Democratic | Joseph Cryan (Incumbent) | 23,345 | 49.7 | ▲18.4 |
| Total votes | | '47,013' | '100.0' | |

New Jersey general election, 2003
| Party | Candidate | Votes | % | ±% |
|---|---|---|---|---|
| Democratic | Neil M. Cohen (Incumbent) | 12,035 | 31.4 | ▼9.9 |
| Democratic | Joseph Cryan (Incumbent) | 12,016 | 31.3 | ▼9.5 |
| Republican | A. Tony Monteiro | 7,515 | 19.6 | N/A |
| Republican | Aristo Carranza | 6,821 | 17.8 | N/A |
| Total votes | | '38,387' | '100.0' | |

New Jersey general election, 2001
| Party | Candidate | Votes | % |
|---|---|---|---|
| Democratic | Neil M. Cohen (Incumbent) | 22,457 | 41.3 |
| Democratic | Joseph Cryan | 22,162 | 40.8 |
| Schundler for Governor | Dency J. Rivera | 4,877 | 9.0 |
| Schundler for Governor | Ralph J. Fabre | 4,852 | 8.9 |
| Total votes | | 54,348 | 100.0 |

Party political offices
| Preceded by Bonnie Watson Coleman | Chair of the New Jersey Democratic Party; 2006–2010 | Succeeded by John S. Wisniewski |
New Jersey General Assembly
| Preceded by Bonnie Watson Coleman | Majority Leader of the New Jersey General Assembly; 2010–2012 | Succeeded by Louis Greenwald |
