= Roselle Public Schools =

School district in Union County, New Jersey, US

- District Administration Building

Address
- 710 Locust Street Roselle, Union County, 07203; United States
- Coordinates: 40.651964°N 74.264981°W

District information
- Grades: PreK-12
- Superintendent: Nathan L. Fisher
- Business administrator: Irene Gray
- Schools: 7

Students and staff
- Enrollment: 3,080 (as of 2023–24)
- Faculty: 247.5 FTEs
- Student–teacher ratio: 12.5:1

Other information
- District Factor Group: DE
- Website: www.roselleschools.org
Ind.	Per pupil	District spending	Rank (*)	K-12 average	%± vs. average
1A	Total Spending	$19,993	56	$18,891	5.8%
1	Budgetary Cost	16,302	61	14,783	10.3%
2	Classroom Instruction	10,160	63	8,763	15.9%
6	Support Services	2,409	52	2,392	0.7%
8	Administrative Cost	1,840	62	1,485	23.9%
10	Operations & Maintenance	1,666	40	1,783	−6.6%
13	Extracurricular Activities	226	7	268	−15.7%
16	Median Teacher Salary	54,941	4	64,043
Data from NJDoE 2014 Taxpayers' Guide to Education Spending. *Of K-12 districts with 1,800-3,500 students. Lowest spending=1; Highest=68

Roselle Public Schools is a comprehensive community public school district that serves students in pre-kindergarten through twelfth grade from the borough of Roselle, in Union County, in the U.S. state of New Jersey.

As of the 2023–24 school year, the district, comprised of seven schools, had an enrollment of 3,080 students and 247.5 classroom teachers (on an FTE basis), for a student–teacher ratio of 12.5:1.

== History ==
While the district had a high school program as far back as the 19th century, the first standalone facility for a high school was completed in 1914, with an addition completed in 1929 at a cost of $400,000 (equivalent to $7,500,000 in 2025).

The district had been classified by the New Jersey Department of Education as being in District Factor Group "DE", the fifth-highest of eight groupings. District Factor Groups organize districts statewide to allow comparison by common socioeconomic characteristics of the local districts. From lowest socioeconomic status to highest, the categories are A, B, CD, DE, FG, GH, I and J.

== Schools ==
Schools in the district (with 2023–24 enrollment data from the National Center for Education Statistics) are:

Preschools

- Kindergarten Success Academy with 219 students in Kindergarten
  - Lauren Gonzalez, principal

Elementary schools

- Harrison Elementary School with 310 students in grades 1–4
  - Melissa Nevarez, principal
- Dr. Charles C. Polk Elementary School with 277 students in grades 1–4
  - Melissa Allison, principal
- Washington Elementary School with 358 students in grades 1–4
  - Victoria Lih, principal

Middle schools

- Leonard V. Moore Middle School with 457 students in grades 5–6
  - Tomeeko Hunt, principal
- Grace Wilday Junior High School with 484 students in grades 7–8
  - Allen Ashby, principal

High school

- Abraham Clark High School with 918 students in grades 9–12
  - Andreea Harry, principal

== Administration ==
Core members of the district's administration are:

- Nathan L. Fisher, Superintendent
- Irene Gray, school business administrator and board secretary

== Board of education ==
The district's board of education, comprised of nine members, sets policy and oversees the fiscal and educational operation of the district through its administration. As a Type II school district, the board's trustees are elected directly by voters to serve three-year terms of office on a staggered basis, with three seats up for election each year held (since 2012) as part of the November general election. The board appoints a superintendent to oversee the district's day-to-day operations and a business administrator to supervise the business functions of the district.

Board members for 2024–2025

- Courtney Washington, Board President
- Ieesha Turnage, Vice President
- Angela Alvey-Wimbush
- Cynthia Atkins
- Gisselle Bond
- Yessica Chavez
- France Cortez
- Antigua Santos
- Leslie Woody
