= Ed Rodriguez (New Jersey politician) =

American politician

Member of the New Jersey General Assembly from the 20th district
- Incumbent
- Assumed office January 13, 2026 Serving with Annette Quijano
- Preceded by: Reginald Atkins

Personal details
- Party: Democratic
- Website: Legislative webpage

Ed Rodriguez is an American Democratic Party politician who has represented the 20th Legislative District in the New Jersey General Assembly since taking office in January 2026.

== Education and career ==
After graduating from Rutgers University–New Brunswick, Rodriguez earned a Master of Business Administration from New York University Stern School of Business and a Juris Doctor from Rutgers Law School. He worked for Elizabeth, New Jersey, from 2014 to 2025 as its Director of Planning and Community Development.

== New Jersey General Assembly ==
With two-term Democratic incumbent Reginald Atkins not running for re-election, Rodriguez won the primary for the second seat, defeating Sergio Granados by less than 100 votes.

In the 2025 New Jersey General Assembly election in November, Rodriguez and running mate Annette Quijano defeated their Republican opponent by a better than 3–1 margin.
