= Summit (disambiguation) =

A summit is the highest point of a mountain, hill, road, or railway.

Summit may also refer to:

== Places ==
- Summit, Alabama, an unincorporated community
- Summit, Arizona, a census-designated place
- Summit, Arkansas, a city
- Summit, California (disambiguation)
- Summit Bridge, Delaware, an unincorporated community also called Summit
- Summit, Illinois, a village
- Summit, DeKalb County, Indiana, an unincorporated community
- Summit, Greene County, Indiana, an unincorporated community
- Summit, Kentucky, an unincorporated community
- Summit, Mississippi, a town
- Summit, Missouri, an unincorporated community
- Summit, New Jersey, a city
- Summit, New York, a town
- Summit, Oklahoma, a town
- Summit, Oregon, an unincorporated community
- Summit, Rhode Island, a village
- Summit, South Carolina, a town
- Summit, South Dakota, a town
- Summit, Utah, a census-designated place
- Summit, Washington, a census-designated place
- Summit, West Virginia, an unincorporated community
- Summit, Wisconsin (disambiguation)
- Summit Camp, a research station on the Greenland Ice Sheet
- Summit City (disambiguation)
- Summit County (disambiguation)
- Lake Summit, Winter Haven, Florida
- Summit Lake (disambiguation)
- Summit Lakes (disambiguation)
- Summit Mountain (disambiguation)
- Summit Pass (British Columbia), a mountain pass in British Columbia, Canada
- Summit Peak, Colorado
- Mount Ina Coolbrith, California, formerly Summit Peak
- Summit Range, a mountain range in California
- Summit Reservoir in Colorado, U.S.
- Summit Ridge, Graham Land, Antarctica
- Summit, L'Anse Township, Michigan, an unincorporated community
- Summit, Washtenaw County, Michigan, a historic community
- Summit Township (disambiguation)
- Hope, Providence, Rhode Island or Summit, a neighborhood

== Buildings ==
- Summit (Catonsville, Maryland), an historic home
- Summit Playhouse, a theater in Summit, New Jersey
- Summit Square or Summit Bank Building, the tallest office building in Fort Wayne, Indiana

== Arts and entertainment ==
=== Cinema ===
- Summit (film), a 1968 drama film

=== Games and puzzles ===
- Summit (game), a board game based on the Cold War
- Summit (puzzle), a word puzzle and scoring system; see Showdown (game)

=== Music ===
- Summit (groups), a type of collaboration in jazz music
- Summit Records, an American record label
- Summit (album), a 1974 album by Astor Piazzolla and Gerry Mulligan
- Summit, a 2010 album by American band Thou
- "Summit" (song), a 2007 song by Josh Gabriel
- "Summit", a 2013 song by Skrillex featuring Ellie Goulding from Bangarang

=== Television ===
- "Summit" (The Outer Limits), a 1999 television episode
- "Summit" (Stargate SG-1), a 2001 television episode

== Business ==
- Summit Air, an air charter airline serving northern Canada
- Summit Aerosports, American producer of the powered parachute Summit 2
- Summit Bank, based in Pakistan
- Summit Brewing Company, a craft brewery in Saint Paul, Minnesota, US
- Summit Business Media, a business-to-business media and information company
- Summit (company), US-based IT services company
- Summit Cookie Bars, a candy bar that is no longer produced
- Summit Credit Union, Madison, Wisconsin, US
- Summit Entertainment, a movie production company
- Summit Group, a large Bangladeshi conglomerate
- Summit Mall, Fairlawn, Ohio, US
- Summit Media, a magazine publishing company in the Philippines
- Summit Racing Equipment, a mail order automotive performance equipment company
- Summit Systems, a financial software editor, now part of the Misys group

== Plants ==
- Summit, a variety of hop
- Summit, a muscadine (Vitis rotundifolia) cultivar

== Schools ==
- Clarks Summit University, formerly known as Baptist Bible College & Seminary, in Clarks Summit, Pennsylvania, US
- Summit High School (disambiguation)
- Summit Middle School (disambiguation)
- Summit School (disambiguation)

== Sports ==
- Summit Arena, an indoor arena in Hot Springs, Arkansas
- Summit League, a U.S. college athletic conference
- Summit Motorsports Park, a drag racing facility near Norwalk, Ohio
- Summit Ski Area, Mount Hood, Oregon

== Transportation-related ==
- AJW Summit, a British high specification motorcycle made by AJW Motorcycles between 1927 and 1931
- Eagle Summit, a subcompact automobile sold by the Chrysler Corporation
- Summit Airport (Alaska), Summit, Alaska
- Summit Airport (Delaware), Middletown, Delaware
- Summit Avenue (disambiguation)
- Summit Bridge, connecting Newark and Dover, Delaware
- Summit rail station (disambiguation), several rail stations
- Summit Tunnel, West Yorkshire, England

== Other uses ==
- Summit (meeting), a meeting of heads of state or government
- Summit (supercomputer), a TOP500 supercomputer developed by IBM
- USS Summit (AMc-106), a US Navy coastal minesweeper
- Summit Awards, for advertising
- Summit Ministries, an evangelical Christian organization
- SUMMIT, biennial technical festival conducted by the College of Engineering Chengannur, India
- Summit, an interlibrary loan service offered by the Orbis Cascade Alliance

== See also ==
- The Summit (disambiguation)
- Summit Series (disambiguation), competitions between Soviet and Canadian professional ice hockey players
- summit1g, American internet personality Jaryd Russell Lazar
- Albert Somit (1919–2020), American political scientist
- Sumit or Sumeet, an Indian masculine given name
- SUMIT, a connector between computer expansion buses
