= Summit Township, Nebraska =

Summit Township, Nebraska may refer to the following places:

- Summit Township, Burt County, Nebraska
- Summit Township, Butler County, Nebraska

See also

- Summit Township (disambiguation)
