= Summit School =

Summit School may refer to:

- Summit School (Nyack), New York
- Summit School (Queens), New York
- Summit School (Winston-Salem, North Carolina) in Winston-Salem, North Carolina
- Summit School (Seattle, Washington), in Seattle, Washington

== See also ==
- Summit Middle School (disambiguation)
- Summit High School (disambiguation)
- Summit School District 104, Summit, Illinois
- St. Paul Academy and Summit School, Saint Paul, Minnesota
