= Summit Township, Michigan =

Summit Township is the name of some places in the U.S. state of Michigan:

- Summit Township, Jackson County, Michigan
- Summit Township, Mason County, Michigan

See also

- Summit Township (disambiguation)
