= Summit City =

Summit City may refer to one of the following places in the United States:

- A nickname of the city of Fort Wayne, Indiana
- The town of Summit City, California, incorporated into Shasta Lake City
- Summit City, California, former name of Meadow Lake, Nevada County, California
- Summit City School District in Union County, New Jersey
- The original name of the town now called Whitesburg, Kentucky
- Summit City, Michigan, an unincorporated community in rural Grand Traverse County.
