= Summit, California =

Summit, California may refer to:

- Summit, Santa Cruz County, California
- Altamont, California, formerly known as The Summit
- Beaumont, California, formerly known as Summit or Summit Station

== See also ==
- Summit (disambiguation)
- Summit City, California (disambiguation)
- Summit Station, California (disambiguation)
