= Summitt =

Summitt is a surname. Notable people with the surname include:

- Pat Summitt (1952–2016), American college basketball coach
- Tyler Summitt (born 1990), American college basketball player and coach, son of Pat

== See also ==
- Summit (disambiguation)
