= Sumit =

- Gender: Male
- Language: Hindi

Origin
- Meaning: 1. Good friend; 2. Well pleased
- Region of origin: India

Other names
- Alternative spelling: Sumit

Sumit or Sumeet is a masculine given name. It originated from Devanagari language and means "good friend" or "well pleased".

== Notable people ==
Notable people with the given name include:

- Sumeet Dogra (born 1969), former Indian cricketer
- Sumeet Hukamchand Mittal (born 1971), Indian television producer
- Sumeet Passi (born 1994), Indian footballer
- Sumeet Raghavan (born 1971), Indian actor
- Sumeet Sachdev (born 1976), Indian television actor
- Sumeet Saigal, former Indian film actor
- Sumeet Samos (born 1993), Indian rapper
- Sumeet Verma (born 1990), Indian cricketer
- Sumeet Vyas (born 1983), Indian actor
- Sumit (field hockey) (born 1996), Indian field hockey player
- Sumit Bhaduri (born 1948), Indian chemist
- Sumit Bhardwaj, Indian television actor
- Sumit Ganguly, professor at Indiana University
- Sumit Jain (born 1984), Indian entrepreneur
- Sumit Jamuar, former banker at Lloyds Banking Group
- Sumit Kaul, Indian actor and voice actor
- Sumit Khatri (born 1989), Indian cricketer
- Sumit Kumar (born 1995), Indian cricketer
- Sumit Kumar (field hockey) (born 1997), Indian field hockey player
- Sumit Malik (born 1993), Indian freestyle wrestler
- Sumit Mathur (born 1981), Indian cricketer
- Sumit Nag, Indian cricketer
- Sumit Nagal (born 1997), Indian tennis player
- Sumit Narwal (born 1982), Indian cricketer
- Sumit Nijhawan (born 1978), Indian actor
- Sumit Panda (born 1979), former Indian cricketer
- Sumit Ranjan Das, Indian physicist
- Sumit Ruikar (born 1990), Indian cricketer
- Sumit Sambhal Lega, Indian television series
- Sumit Sangwan (born 1993), Indian amateur boxer
- Sumit Sarkar (born 1939), Indian historian
- Sumit Sethi, Indian record producer
- Sumit Shome (born 1955), former Indian cricketer
- Sumit Singh (cricketer) (born 1987), Indian cricketer
- Sumit Suri, Indian film actor
- Sumit Vats (born 1982), Indian television actor

== See also ==
- Stackable Unified Module Interconnect Technology (SUMIT)
- Summit (disambiguation)
