= Summit Township, Minnesota =

Summit Township is the name of some places in the U.S. state of Minnesota:

- Summit Township, Beltrami County, Minnesota
- Summit Township, Steele County, Minnesota

== See also ==
- Summit Lake Township, Nobles County, Minnesota
- Summit Township (disambiguation)
