= Summit City, California =

Summit City, California may refer to:

- Meadow Lake, Nevada County, California
- Summit City, Shasta County, California
- Summit City canyon, forms the south face of the mountain Round Top in Alpine County, California
- Summit City Creek, a river in California
