= Super Series (disambiguation) =

The Super Series were exhibition ice hockey games between Soviet and North American teams from 1976 to 1991.

Super Series can also refer to:

== Ice hockey ==
- Super Series '76, played between Soviet teams and NHL teams
- Super Series '76-77, played between the CSKA Moscow (Red Army) team and WHA teams
- Summit Series, 1972 series known in certain sources as the Super Series
- 2007 Super Series, an ice hockey series between Russian and Canadian juniors
- CHL Canada/Russia Series, known as the Subway Super Series from 2009-2014

== Other sports ==
- BWF Super Series, the Super Series of badminton
- Grand Prix Super Series, category of men's tennis tournaments
- ICC Super Series, the Super Series of cricket
- PSA Super Series, the Super Series of squash
- World Boxing Super Series, a boxing tournament featuring several world champions

== See also ==
- Summit Series (disambiguation)
