= The Summit =

The Summit may refer to:

== Structures ==
- The Summit (Wheatfield, New York), shopping center
- The Summit (Alabama), shopping center
- The Summit of Louisville, the original name of a Kentucky shopping center now known as the Paddock Shops
- The Summit (Reno, Nevada), shopping center
- The Summit (San Francisco), condominium
- The Summit (Hong Kong)
- The Summit (Houston), Texas, an indoor arena now known as the Lakewood Church Central Campus
- The Summit, observation deck in One Vanderbilt, New York City

== Film and television ==
- The Summit (2012 film), a film about the mountain K2, by Nick Ryan
- The Summit (2017 film), an Argentine film
- The Summit (TV miniseries), a 2008 Canadian two-part miniseries
- "The Summit" (The Americans), an episode of The Americans
- "The Summit" (Star Wars: The Bad Batch), an episode of Star Wars: The Bad Batch
- The Summit (TV series), a 2023 Australian reality television series
  - The Summit (American TV series), an American adaptation of the Australian series

== Other uses ==
- The Summit, Queensland, a town in Australia
- The Summit Media Group, a former television syndication company
- The Summit (Easthampton), weekly newspaper in Easthampton, Massachusetts, published by the Daily Hampshire Gazette
- "The Summit" (poem), 2023 work by UK Poet Laureate Simon Armitage
- Altamont, California, formerly The Summit
- Summit League, NCAA Division I athletics conference (a.k.a. The Summit)
- The Summit Bechtel Family National Scout Reserve, a Boy Scouts of America reservation
- WAPS (FM), branded 91.3 The Summit, a non-commercial radio station in Akron, Ohio

== See also ==
- Summit (disambiguation)
- "The Summitt", the name given to the basketball court at Thompson–Boling Arena in honor of longtime coach Pat Summitt
