= Ryan O'Malley (American football) =

American football player (born 1993)

No. 85, 81, 17
- Position: Tight end

Personal information
- Born: July 24, 1993 (age 33); Summit, New Jersey, U.S.
- Listed height: 6 ft 6 in (1.98 m)
- Listed weight: 285 lb (129 kg)

Career information
- High school: Summit
- College: Penn
- NFL draft: 2016: undrafted

Career history
- Oakland Raiders (2016); Buffalo Bills (2017)*; New York Giants (2017); Atlanta Legends (2019)*; Team 9 (2020)*; Los Angeles Wildcats (2020); Michigan Panthers (2022)
- * Offseason or practice squad member only

Awards and highlights
- 2× Second-team All-Ivy (2014–2015)
- Stats at Pro Football Reference

Ryan O'Malley (born July 24, 1993) is an American former professional football player who was a tight end in the National Football League (NFL). He played college football for the Penn Quakers, and signed with the Oakland Raiders as an undrafted free agent in 2016.

== Early life ==
O'Malley was a three-year letterman in football at Summit High School in Summit, New Jersey, where he played wide receiver and defensive end. He was a member of the 2009 team that went 12-0 and won the Group 2 State Championship. He was a team captain as a senior in 2010. He was named First-team All-County and First-team All-Conference in 2010. He also earned various All-State honors in 2010. In 2010, he recorded 11 receptions, 195 receiving yards, seven receiving touchdowns, 56 tackles and 14 sacks. He was also a two-year letterman in track and basketball.

He graduated from Summit High School in 2011.

== College career ==
O'Malley played tight end for the Penn Quakers of the University of Pennsylvania from 2011 to 2015. He did not appear in any games in 2011.

He played in ten games in 2012, recording six receptions for 93 yards and two touchdowns. He played in ten games, in 2013, catching 10 passes for 93 yards and two touchdowns.

In 2014, he was named to the Preseason College Football Performance Awards Tight End Watch List. He appeared in ten games, recording seven receptions for 103 yards and two touchdowns. He garnered Second-team All-Ivy accolades.

He played in ten games in 2015, catching 20 passes for 202 yards and three touchdowns. He was named Second-team All-Ivy and was also a team captain.

O'Malley played in 40 career games, recording 43 receptions for 495 yards and nine touchdowns.

== Professional career ==
O'Malley was rated the 15th best tight end in the 2016 NFL draft by NFLDraftScout.com.

Pre-draft measurables
Height	Weight	40-yard dash	10-yard split	20-yard split	20-yard shuttle	Three-cone drill	Vertical jump	Broad jump	Bench press
6 ft 6 in (1.98 m)	258 lb (117 kg)	4.77 s	1.69 s	2.75 s	4.53 s	7.47 s	32 in (0.81 m)	9 ft 9 in (2.97 m)	19 reps
All values from Villanova Pro Day

=== Oakland Raiders ===
O'Malley signed with the Oakland Raiders on May 10, 2016, after going undrafted in the 2016 NFL Draft. He was released on September 3 and signed to the team's practice squad the next day. He was promoted to the active roster on October 5. He made his NFL debut on October 9, 2016, against the San Diego Chargers. He was released by the Raiders on November 26, 2016, and was re-signed to the practice squad on November 29. He signed a reserve/future contract with the Raiders on January 9, 2017. On September 2, 2017, he was waived by the Raiders.

=== Buffalo Bills ===
On October 10, 2017, O'Malley was signed to the Buffalo Bills' practice squad. He was released on November 1, 2017.

=== New York Giants ===
On December 12, 2017, O'Malley was signed to the New York Giants' practice squad. He was promoted to the active roster on December 30, 2017.

On April 6, 2018, the Giants re-signed O'Malley. He was waived on September 1, 2018.

=== Atlanta Legends ===
O'Malley was signed by the Atlanta Legends of the Alliance of American Football, but was waived before the start of the 2019 regular season.

=== Los Angeles Wildcats ===
O'Malley signed with the XFL's Team 9 practice squad during the regular season. He was signed by the Los Angeles Wildcats on March 9, 2020. He had his contract terminated when the league suspended operations on April 10, 2020.

O'Malley had a tryout with the New Orleans Saints on August 17, 2020.

=== Michigan Panthers ===
On April 28, 2022, O'Malley signed with the Michigan Panthers of the United States Football League (USFL). He was transferred to the team's inactive roster on April 30. He was moved to the active roster on May 11. O'Malley was transferred back to the inactive roster on May 20 with an upper arm injury.
