= Edward F. Wente =

American professor emeritus of Egyptology

Edward Wente
- Born: October 7, 1930 (age 95); New York City, New York, United States
- Education: University of Chicago (BA, PhD)
- Occupations: Egyptologist, Archaeologist, Professor
- Parent(s): Edward Frank; Sophia

Edward Frank Wente (born October 7, 1930) is an American professor emeritus of Egyptology and the Department of Near Eastern Languages and Civilizations at the University of Chicago. He received his PhD from the University of Chicago in 1959 and lectured there from 1963 to 1996. He is also a longstanding member of the Oriental Institute, Chicago. Wente also republished and retranslated the voluminous "Late Ramesside Letters" correspondence from Deir el-Medina in 1967. One of his major works is Letters from Ancient Egypt (1990), published by the Scholarly Press.

== Early life and education ==
Born in New York City on October 7, 1930 to mother Sophia Wente from York, Pennsylvania, who herself had graduated from Columbia University Teachers College in New York and Edward Frank Sr. from Iowa who in 1940 worked as a physicist at a telephone company. Edward Wente had one sibling, Henry C. Wente. Raised in Summit, New Jersey, Wente graduated from Summit High School in 1948.

== Career ==
Wente received his AB, graduating in three years from the University of Chicago in 1951. In 1954, Wente was a Fulbright exchange student at Cairo University, "serving as a director of the Cairo office of the American Research Center in Egypt." In 1959 he received his PhD, with William F. Edgerton his advisor. Wente's dissertation was titled, The Syntax of Verbs of Motion in Egyptian. He taught at the university from 1959 to 1996. University professors were John A. Wilson, Edgerton and Keith C. Seele. Wente was consulted as one of the Egyptian experts for the TV documentary Pyramid to "make sure this show was historically on track".

In the preface to the anthology Gold of Praise Wente's peers acknowledged his long career in Egyptology, within which his interests ranged from "grammar to studies of chronology, iconography, and religion. In each of these fields he has made significant and lasting contributions, easily on par with colleagues who have a single, more restricted focus." Editors, Emily Teeter and John A. Larson go on to state that Wente's books have become classic references for study in the field, but his "greatest legacy may be the fact that the majority of Egyptologists in major American institutions received their training from Professor Wente. Their own vast body of publications, and in turn their own students, can be taken as yet another tribute not only to his intellect but also to his commitment to teaching. The fact that the contributions in this volume come from the United States, Europe, and the Middle East is an indication of the high regard in which Professor Wente is held by his colleagues."

== Tiye ==
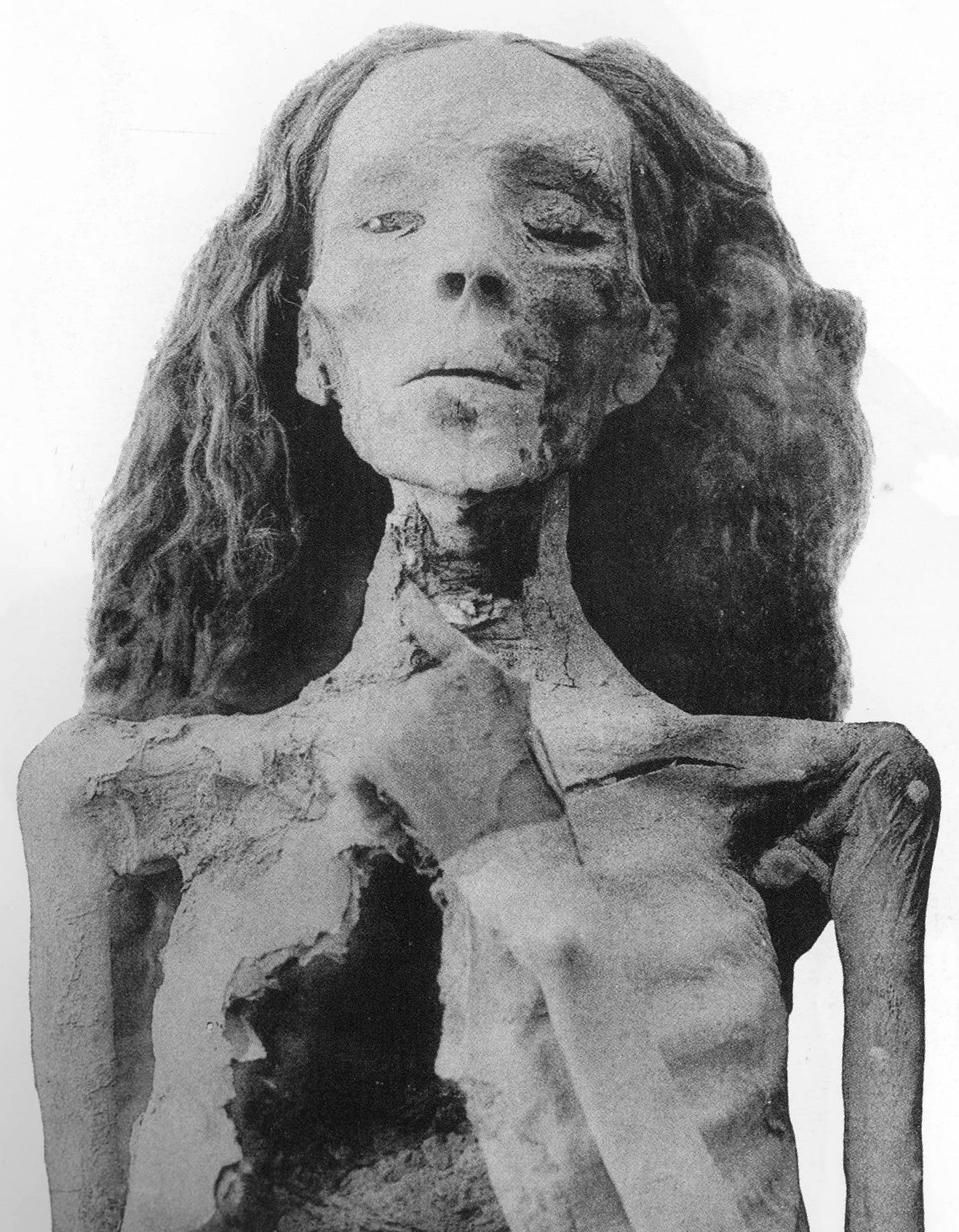
The mummy of Queen Tiye, front view, taken in 1912, back when it was still known as the Elder Lady.

A long-haired Egyptian mummy found in 1898 of an older woman in a side chamber of the tomb of Amenhotep II was rumored to be the mother of pharaoh Akhenaten and grandmother of Tutankhamun, Queen Tiye. Other archeologists believed the unwrapped and looted mummy could not be Tiye and was named "the Elder Lady". University of Michigan Professor, James Harris and team x-rayed the mummies of Yuya and Thuya who were known to have been the parents to Tiye. When uploading the scans to a computer it was discovered that the profiles matched that of the Elder Lady.

Based on the position of the Elder Lady's left arm, Wente suspected it was a woman of royalty. Her hand was closed in a fist and positioned over her chest as if she had been holding a scepter. A lock of hair in a miniature gold casket with a scroll mentioning Queen Tiye was found in the tomb of Tutankhamun. In 1976, Wente and Harris were given three hairs from the casket and used microprobe analysis to compare the hair found in the casket with the hair on the head of the mummy, which they found to be identical. In 2010, DNA found on the mummy was tested and Wente and Harris's theory was verified, though Wente stated in 1978 that the Michigan team did most of the work.

== Personal life ==
In 1999, the Oriental Institute published a collection of essays by Egyptologists in honor of Edward Wente in honor of his retirement. "Gold of Praise: Studies on Ancient Egypt in Honor of Edward F. Wente".

Wente met his wife, Leila Ibrahim when he was a graduate student and they married in 1970. She taught classes specializing in the Greco-Roman world and Coptic art.

Wente is an avid fan of railroading and has a collection of model trains. He is active in the Lutheran Church.

== Publications ==
As of November 2025, Scopus lists 2 publications by Wente, which have been cited 22 times and a h-index of 2.

=== Books ===
- Wente, Edward F. (1990). Letters from Ancient Egypt. Edited by Edmund S. Meltzer. Translated by Edward F. Wente. Atlanta: Scholars Press, Society of Biblical Literature. ISBN 1-55540-472-3.
- Harris, James E. (Author), Edward F. Wente (Editor). (1980). An X-Ray Atlas of the Royal Mummies. University of Chicago Press. ISBN 978-0226317458.
- Simpson, William Kelly (Editor/translator), Robert K. Ritner (Translator), Vincent A. Tobin (Translator), Edward F. Wente Jr. (Translator). (1972). The Literature of Ancient Egypt: An Anthology of Stories, Instructions, Stelae, Autobiographies, and Poetry. Yale University Press.
- Wente, Edward Frank (1967). Late Ramesside Letters, (The Oriental Institute of the University of Chicago. Studies in Ancient Oriental Civilization, no. 33. University of Chicago Press. PDF
- Wente, Edward Frank (1962). Egyptian "make Merry" Songs Reconsidered. University of Chicago Press.

=== Selected articles ===
- Funerary Beliefs of the Ancient Egyptians: An interpretations of the Burials and Texts, Expedition, Winter 1982, pp. 17–26 PDF
- Who was who among the Royal Mummies (the Oriental Institute of the University of Chicago: Winter 1995) No. 144 (20 pages) PDF
- Mummy of the "Elder Lady" in the Tomb of Amenhotep II: Egyptian Museum Catalog Number 61070 (American Association for the Advancement of Science: June 9, 1978) New Series, Vol. 200, no. 4346. pp. 1149–1151. with James E. Harris, Edward F. Wente, Charles F. Cox, Ibrahim El Nawaway, Charles J. Kowalski, Arthur T. Storey, William R. Russell, Paul V. Ponitz and Geoffrey F. Walker.
- (with Charles C. Van Siclen III), A Chronology of the New Kingdom (pp.217-262) in 'Studies in Honor of George R. Hughes', The Oriental Institute of the University of Chicago, Studies in Ancient Oriental Civilization 39, January 12, 1977 PDF

== Book Published in Honor of Edward F. Wente ==
- Gold of Praise: Studies on Ancient Egypt in honor of Edward F. Wente, (ed: Emily Teeter & John A. Larson), The Oriental Institute of the University of Chicago, Studies in Ancient Oriental Civilization 58, 1999 ARCHIVED PDF
