= Baltimore Town, California =

Baltimore
- Former settlement
- Location in California
- Coordinates: 39°23′12″N 120°31′51″W
- Country: United States
- State: California
- County: Nevada County
- Elevation: 7,477 ft (2,279 m)

Baltimore Town, previously Wightman’s Camp, was a historic gold mining camp in eastern Nevada County, California that was founded in 1865. After gold mining stopped in the area, the town faded away around 1869.

Baltimore was situated in the High Sierras at an elevation of 7,477 ft (2,279 m) about four miles north of Cisco Grove, California, and about 10 linear miles west of modern Highway 89. Its history is intertwined with that of the Excelsior mining district whose principal town was Summit City, California.

== Boom ==
The Excelsior mining district was started by Henry Hartley, a fur trapper who built a cabin near Meadow Lake around 1860. In June 1863, he discovered gold and staked out several claims. Others followed and by the spring of 1865, rumors of gold in the area created a local gold rush. Not only was gold reported to be plentiful, unlike many mining districts, year-round water was readily and abundantly available. By the summer of 1865, hundreds of miners, many from the Virginia City, Nevada area, had flocked to the area, even though, as one historian observed, “[g]etting to the Meadow Lake country was no easy matter.“

In late 1865, the town of Baltimore was started about two miles southeast of Summit City on the northwest side of Old Man Mountain near Wagon Wheel Lake. The town was connected by a toll road to Summit City. Initially called Wightman’s Camp, it soon became Baltimore since Wightman was a native of Baltimore, Maryland. Sometimes, the word Town or City appears after the word Baltimore to distinguish it from the one in Maryland.

Prospects for Baltimore initially appeared promising. It was located near the promising Baltimore ledge of gold-bearing granite. The principal mines included the Keystone and the Potosi, both owned by Hartley, the Sacramento and the Justice. In November 1865, it was described as "a flourishing place, and in the spring many buildings for business purposes will be erected."

== Bust ==
The gold rush in the Excelsior district soon proved to be a bubble that quickly burst. Though gold was there, it proved to be very difficult and expensive to extract. Mining soon stopped and by 1869, the population of Meadow Lake had dropped from 4000 to 60. It along with Baltimore and the other towns in the area were soon abandoned.

In 1880, Baltimore was described as a town “which once had five or six buildings, but whose site is now marked by one lonely and deserted house.”
