= Seth Ryan =

American football player and coach (born 1994)

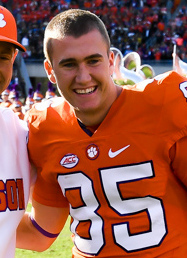
- Ryan with Clemson in 2016

New York Jets
- Title: Passing game coordinator

Personal information
- Born: March 26, 1994 (age 32); Phoenix, Arizona, U.S.
- Listed height: 5 ft 11 in (1.80 m)
- Listed weight: 180 lb (82 kg)

Career information
- Position: Wide receiver
- High school: Summit (NJ)
- College: Clemson (2013–2016)

Career history
- Los Angeles Chargers (2019–2020) Offensive quality control coach; Detroit Lions (2021–2024) Assistant wide receivers coach; Detroit Lions (2025) Assistant tight ends coach; New York Jets (2026–present) Passing game coordinator

Awards and highlights
- CFP national champion (2016)

Seth Ryan (born March 26, 1994) is an American former football player and current coach who is currently the passing game coordinator for the New York Jets of the National Football League (NFL). He played college football at Clemson. He is best known as being the son of former New York Jets and Buffalo Bills head coach Rex Ryan.

== Playing career ==
Ryan played wide receiver for the Clemson Tigers. Ryan graduated from Summit High School in Summit, New Jersey and was redshirted as a freshman with the Tigers in 2013. On January 9, 2017, Ryan was part of the Clemson team that defeated Alabama in the 2017 College Football Playoff National Championship by a score of 35–31.

== Coaching career ==
In 2019 Seth was hired by the Los Angeles Chargers to be a quality control coach as a part of Anthony Lynn's staff. In 2021 he went with Lynn to the Detroit Lions where he was named the team's assistant wide receivers coach.

In 2022, despite Lynn being fired as offensive coordinator at the end of the 2021 NFL season, Ryan stayed with the Lions and was announced as assistant wide receivers coach.

On February 10, 2026, the New York Jets hired Ryan as their pass game coordinator under offensive coordinator Frank Reich.
