= Summit High School =

Summit High School may refer to:

- Summit High School (Arizona), Phoenix, Arizona
- Yellville–Summit High School, Yellville, Arkansas
- Summit High School (La Quinta, California), a high school in the Desert Sands Unified School District
- Summit High School, an alternative school in the Mount Diablo Unified School District, Concord, California
- Summit High School (Fontana, California), Fontana, California
- Summit Preparatory Charter High School, Redwood City, California
- Summit High School (Frisco, Colorado), Frisco, Colorado
- St. Paul Academy and Summit School, St. Paul, Minnesota
- Rockwood Summit High School, Fenton, Missouri
- Lee's Summit High School, Lee's Summit, Missouri
- Lee's Summit North High School, Lee's Summit, Missouri
- Lee's Summit West High School, Lee's Summit, Missouri
- Summit High School (New Jersey), Summit, New Jersey
- Summit High School (Bend, Oregon), Bend, Oregon
- Summit High School (South Dakota), a high school in Summit, South Dakota
- Summit High School (Tennessee), in Spring Hill, Tennessee
- Mansfield Summit High School, Arlington, Texas
- North Summit High School, in Coalville, Utah
- South Summit High School, in Kamas, Utah

== See also ==
- Summit School (disambiguation), multiple schools
