= Summit Mountain =

Summit Mountain may refer to:

- Summit Mountain (Montana), a mountain in the Beartooth Range, Montana, US
- Summit Mountain (Glacier National Park), a mountain in Montana, US
- Summit Mountain (New York), a mountain in the Adirondacks
- Summit Mountain (Nevada), a summit of Eureka County, Nevada
- Summit Peak (Nevada), a Diamond Mountains summit on the Eureka/White Pine County border
