= Summit Series (disambiguation) =

The Summit Series was an eight-game series of ice hockey between the Soviet Union and Canada, held in September 1972.

Summit Series may also refer to:

- 1974 Summit Series, a competition between Soviet and Canadian professional ice hockey players
- Summit Series (conference), a non-profit organization

== See also ==
- 2007 Super Series, a competition between Russian and Canadian professional ice hockey players
- Super Series (disambiguation)
