= Summit School (Nyack) =

Special school in New York, United States

The Summit School

Location
- 339 North Broadway; Nyack, New York 10960; United States; 41.1028°N 73.9159°W

Information
- Type: Approved private school Residential school Special education
- Religious affiliation: Nonsectarian
- Established: 1974
- Founder: Mayer Stiskin
- NCES School ID: 01904719
- Director: Bruce Goldsmith, Ph.D. (executive director); Brant Goldsmith, Ph.D.
- Principal: Deborah Dolan
- Teaching staff: 23.6 (on an FTE basis)
- Grades: 6–12
- Gender: Co-educational
- Enrollment: 172
- Student to teacher ratio: 7.3
- Campus size: 10 acres (4.0 ha)
- Campus type: Residential
- Accreditation: New York State Department of Education; Board of Regents for the State of New York
- Affiliation: The Summit School (Queens)
- Website: summitnyack.com

The Summit School is a state approved, private residential school for children and adolescents with special needs in Upper Nyack, New York, United States. Founded in 1974 by Mayer Stiskin, the school serves middle and high school students. It is affiliated with the day school of the same name in Queens.

== Program ==
The Summit School at Nyack offers two programs for students in grades 6–12 – day and residential. Students are referred to the day or residential program by their home school district CSE in accordance with the level of structure and supervision that the student requires. While day students leave campus at the end of the school day, students in the residential program continue structured programming with 24-hour care.

Summit collaborates with each student's Committee on Special Education (CSE) to create and implement an individualized Education Program. The school's staff consists of New York State certified special education teachers, content area teachers, teaching assistants and related service providers, including social workers, occupational therapists, school psychologists, psychiatrists, nutritionists, and a speech and language pathologist. While Summit's middle school consists of an 8 to 1 to 1 ratio, its high school has a 12 to 1 to 1 classroom ratio, which allows for academic support in small and personalized classes.

Throughout the year, students are prepared for Regents and Common Core examinations and are availed the Safety Net options designed by the New York State Education Department for students with disabilities. Students at Summit graduate with a New York State Advanced Regents, Regents, or Local Diploma and/or a Career Development and Occupational Students (CDOS) Commencement Credential, all of which are issued by their home school district.

== Media coverage ==
The Summit School at Nyack has repeatedly been the subject of media coverage. In 2002, a student was pushed out of a second-floor window by another student. A 15-year-old student died there in 2014; her corpse was discovered the next morning in her room and her death was determined to be a suicide by asphyxiation.

Jason Samel, a former student, accused the Summit School of child neglect, physical abuse, sexual assault, and verbal abuse, all of which he said were overlooked for years by the school's law enforcement officials. Samel alleged in one event, during an after-school detention when he was 14 years old, he was physically attacked by a male supervisor. He further alleged that when he reported this to another supervisor and to the director of the school, his accusation was dismissed. Several students have accused Summit of maintaining a punishment area, referred to as a "quiet room", where pupils accused of poor conduct or who exhibited rebellious behavior would be taken. Samel described the room as a small enclosed space where students were held for hours without access to restroom facilities for even minor transgressions.

Megan Lane, a former student at Summit School, said she was sexually harassed by a gym teacher when she was 17 years old.

In 2018, former student Robert Csak was arrested for threatening Summit School. He left six threatening voicemails for school security guard, Samuel Esposito for whom he held a long-standing hatred. Csak was later arrested and charged with criminal weapon possession. Police obtained a search warrant for his home and found 19 firearms, a silencer, more than 200 ammunition magazines, bulletproof jackets, gas masks, knives, and collapsible "asp" batons in the stockpile.

The school also runs an animal program, and the animals often go on hikes with students and staff, leading many Nyack residents to grow used to seeing groups hiking with a pig and two goats, as well as dogs.
