= Summit Township =

Summit Township may refer to:

== Arkansas ==
- Summit Township, Boone County, Arkansas
- Summit Township, Marion County, Arkansas, in Marion County, Arkansas

== Illinois ==
- Summit Township, Effingham County, Illinois

== Iowa ==
- Summit Township, Adair County, Iowa
- Summit Township, Clay County, Iowa
- Summit Township, Marion County, Iowa, in Marion County, Iowa
- Summit Township, O'Brien County, Iowa

== Kansas ==
- Summit Township, Chautauqua County, Kansas
- Summit Township, Cloud County, Kansas
- Summit Township, Decatur County, Kansas
- Summit Township, Marion County, Kansas

== Michigan ==
- Summit Township, Jackson County, Michigan
- Summit Township, Mason County, Michigan

== Minnesota ==
- Summit Township, Beltrami County, Minnesota
- Summit Township, Steele County, Minnesota

== Missouri ==
- Summit Township, Bates County, Missouri
- Summit Township, Callaway County, Missouri

== Nebraska ==
- Summit Township, Burt County, Nebraska
- Summit Township, Butler County, Nebraska

== New Jersey ==
- Summit Township, Union County, New Jersey, now the city of Summit

== North Dakota ==
- Summit Township, Richland County, North Dakota, in Richland County, North Dakota

== Ohio ==
- Summit Township, Monroe County, Ohio

== Pennsylvania ==
- Summit Township, Butler County, Pennsylvania
- Summit Township, Crawford County, Pennsylvania
- Summit Township, Erie County, Pennsylvania
- Summit Township, Potter County, Pennsylvania
- Summit Township, Somerset County, Pennsylvania

== South Dakota ==
- Summit Township, Lake County, South Dakota, in Lake County, South Dakota
- Summit Township, Roberts County, South Dakota, in Roberts County, South Dakota

== See also ==
- Summit (disambiguation)
