= Sumit Jamuar =

Indian businessman

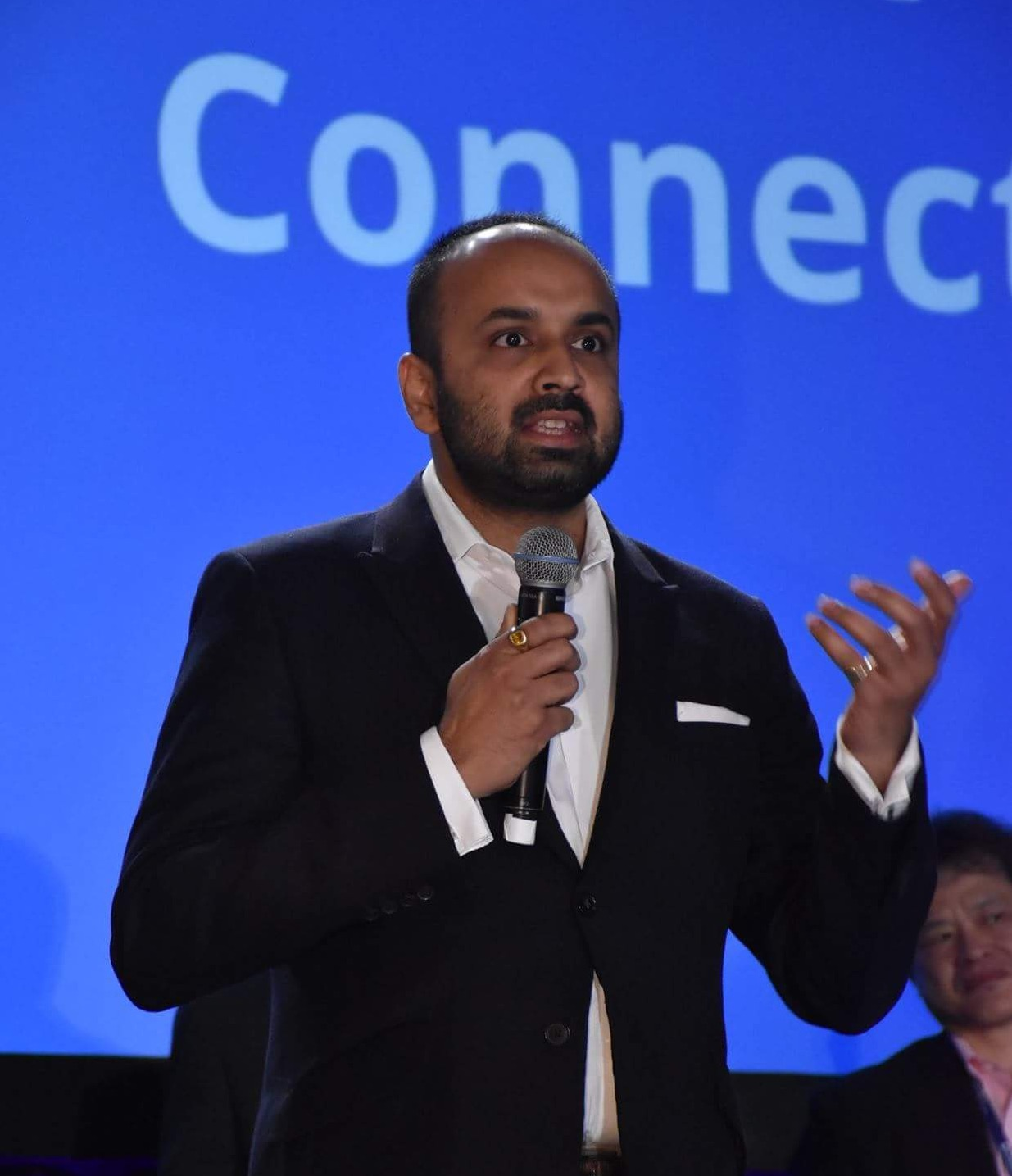
- Education: IIT Delhi, INSEAD
- Occupations: Chairman & CEO, Global Gene Corp

Sumit Jamuar is the chairman, co-founder and CEO of Global Gene Corp, a genomics data platform and applications company that is collecting and analysing diverse genomic and medical datasets to deliver precision healthcare to a global market. Sumit is responsible for the company's long-term strategy and partnerships.

He was formerly a Banker with Lloyds Banking Group, and prior to that a consultant with McKinsey & Company. Sumit has served as CEO of SBICAP (UK) Ltd, European investment banking subsidiary of State Bank of India. He played pivotal role in ideation & creation of FTSE - SBI Bond series indices as partnership between State Bank of India and London Stock Exchange, FTSE TMX which was part of the Joint statement of Hon Prime Ministers of India and UK.

== Early life ==
Sumit was born to Mrs. Rita Jamuar and Prof. Sudhanshu S. Jamuar in Patna. He was brought up in New Delhi at the Indian Institute of Technology (IIT), Delhi campus where his father served a professor in the Electrical Engineering Department.

== Education ==
He holds a bachelor's degree in chemical engineering from the Indian Institute of Technology (IIT), Delhi. He completed his post-graduation in Business Administration from INSEAD, Fontainebleau. He has attended programmes in University of Massachusetts Amherst and Tuck School of Business at Dartmouth.

At INSEAD he contributed to research paper on Corporate Governance "Board Seat Accumulation by Executives: A Shareholder's Perspective" that was published in Journal of Finance and has been cited by over 170 research papers.

== Career ==
Consulting Career

Following graduation from IIT Delhi, Sumit started as a Business Analyst with McKinsey & Company, India. He was the first undergraduate consultant to be hired in the inaugural class of two Business Analysts marking the start of the Business Analyst programme in the Indian office of McKinsey & Company. During his consulting career, he served top Indian and global institutions in banking, steel and automobiles. Key engagements included building the off shoring proposition for a blue-chip Global Bank, international expansion strategy for the top Indian private bank, as well as, report outlining road map of policy initiatives to increase Foreign Direct Investment in India which was launched by the Hon. Finance Minister of India, Jaswant Singh.

Banking Career

Sumit worked with Lloyds, (previously known as Lloyds TSB Bank) London between 2003 and 2012. He held several senior leadership positions in start-ups, global client coverage, strategy & transformation and a turnaround unit in the bank. During his last assignment at the organization, he served as the managing director and Global Head of Sales in the Financial Institutions team and also served as a Member of the Financial Institutions Group Executive Committee at the organization. Prior to that he was MD & Head of Solutions CRE BSU and played a lead role in creating one of the largest turnaround unit for distressed commercial real estate assets. He was also MD & Head of Emerging Markets, and Head of Strategy & Transformation, where he advised the Group Executive Director for Wholesale Bank as chief strategist. He started his career in Lloyds TSB Bank as Venture Manager in the Corporate Venturing Unit. He was also appointed Chairman of Lloyds GEM Network, the ethnic diversity network.

Other Roles

Sumit has been an advisor and acting chief executive for Africa and Europe to GEMS Education, the largest private school operator in the world for their expansion, building and opening of schools in Kenya, Uganda and Switzerland, as well as acquisition of Ecole de Roches, Normandy. He was a member of the European Council for BAFT-IFSA, a leading financial services trade body, where he had leading involvement in industry initiatives like engagement with Regulators and Members of Parliament on BASEL III. He is also a fellow at the Institute of Directors, since 2009. IOD is a UK-based organization incorporated in 1906 that represents and sets standards for company directors.

Sumit was vice chairman of International Telecommunication Union (ITU) & Gates Foundation initiative on Digital Financial Service for Financial Inclusion. He has served as co-chair of the Consumer Experience & Protection working group of ITU.

Current Position

Sumit serves as Chairman & CEO at Global Gene Corp. He co-founded the company in 2013 with his brother, Saumya Jamuar (head of the SingHealth Duke-NUS Genomic Medicine center), geneticist Jonathan Picker at Boston Children's Hospital and corporate strategist Kushagra Sharma to address the lack of diversity in the genomic datasets used to inform the development of novel diagnostics and therapies to benefit a global population.

Global Gene Corp has a particular focus on gathering data about genomic diversity in India, and established a partnership in 2018 with the Regeneron Genetics Center to create the largest research programme specifically aimed at generating genomic understanding of populations in the sub-continent.

The company has also established a partnership with the University of Namibia and the Namibian government to develop a national genomics initiative, aiming to study the genetic makeup of the Namibian population. Data will then be used to develop relevant precision medicine approaches and build a Centre of Excellence in Genomics in Namibia.

Sumit is one of 26 speakers taking part in the televised series TED Talks India: Nayi Baat (New Conversations), hosted by actor Shah Rukh Khan and broadcast on Hindi channel StarPlus, Nat Geo and English channel Star World in November 2019.

== Charitable and cultural activities ==
Sumit is associated with various charitable and cultural organizations such as Lake Tanganyika Floating Health Clinic, United Kingdom, SPIC MACAY, UK and Global Education & Skills Forum (GESF) 2013.
