= Summit Avenue =

Summit Avenue may refer to:

- Summit Avenue (St. Paul), Minnesota
- Summit Avenue (Hudson Palisades), New Jersey
  - Summit Avenue, the original name of Journal Square Transportation Center, Jersey City, New Jersey
- Two tram stops on the MBTA Green Line system, Massachusetts:
  - Summit Avenue (MBTA station), an existing station on the C branch
  - Summit Avenue station (MBTA Green Line B branch), a former station on the B branch
