= Summit High School (New Jersey) =

High school in Union County, New Jersey, US

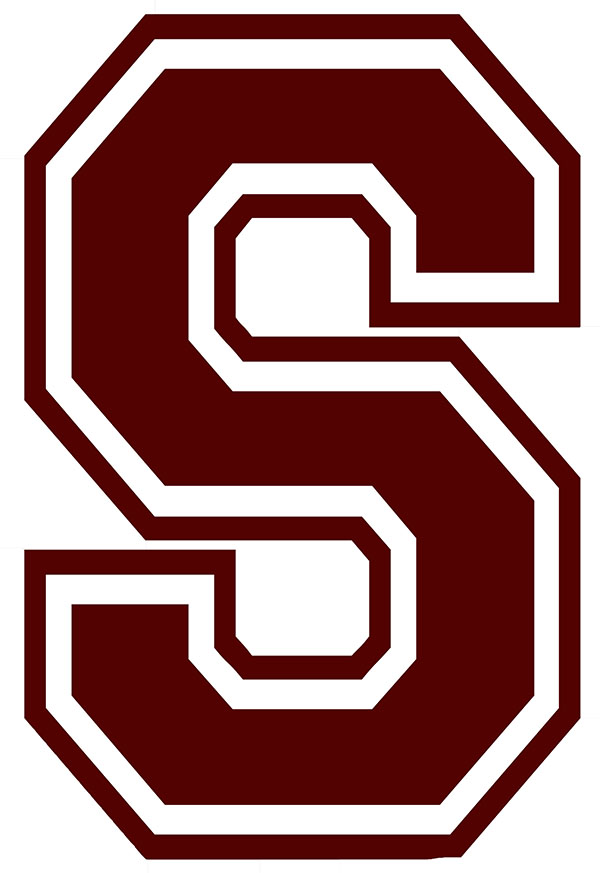

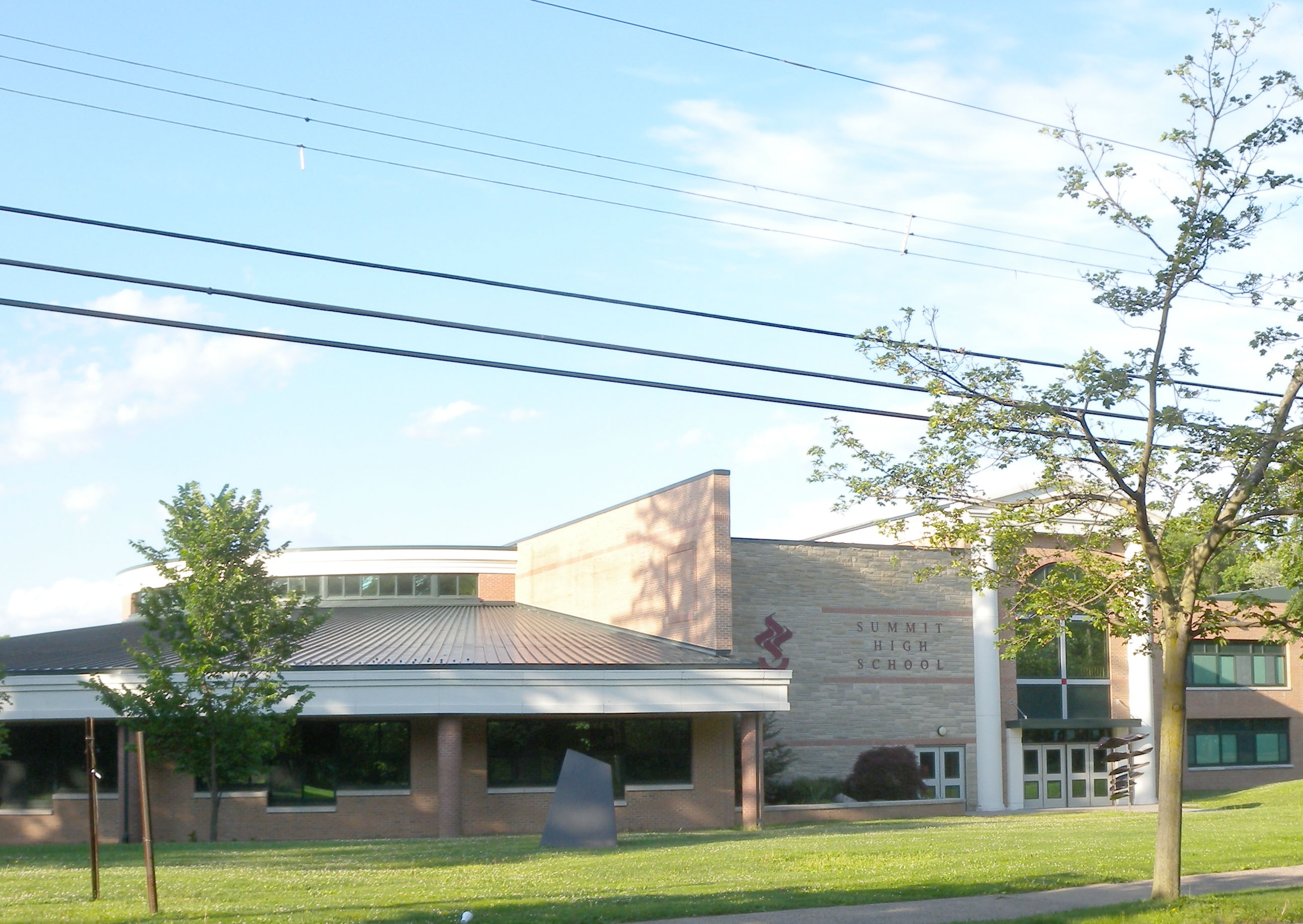

Location
- 125 Kent Place Boulevard; Summit, Union County, New Jersey 07901; United States; 40.719266°N 74.371343°W

Information
- Type: Public high school"
- Established: 1888
- School district: Summit Public Schools
- NCES School ID: 341590005708
- Principal: Stacy Grimaldi
- Faculty: 105.6 FTEs
- Grades: 9-12
- Enrollment: 1,198 (as of 2024–25)
- Student to teacher ratio: 11.4:1
- Colors: Maroon; White and Gold
- Athletics conference: Union County Interscholastic Athletic Conference (general); Big Central Football Conference (football)
- Team name: Hilltoppers
- Accreditation: Middle States Association of Colleges and Schools
- Publication: Quintessence (literary magazine)
- Newspaper: The Verve
- Yearbook: The Top
- Website: www.summit.k12.nj.us/schools/summit-high-school

Summit High School is a four-year comprehensive public high school in Summit, in Union County, in the U.S. state of New Jersey, serving students in ninth through twelfth grades as the lone secondary school of the Summit Public Schools. The school has been accredited by the Middle States Association of Colleges and Schools Commission on Elementary and Secondary Schools since 1934.

As of the 2024–25 school year, the school had an enrollment of 1,198 students and 105.6 classroom teachers (on an FTE basis), for a student–teacher ratio of 11.4:1. There were 193 students (16.1% of enrollment) eligible for free lunch and 42 (3.5% of students) eligible for reduced-cost lunch.

== History ==
The school opened in 1888 due to an increased need for a publicly operated secondary school within the City of Summit. The school's athletic teams are referred to as the Hilltoppers, though the school's actual mascot is a mountain goat wearing a Summit High School athletic jersey. The school's colors are maroon, white and gold, although for most of its history they were maroon and white.

The Velvet Underground played their first paid concert in the high school auditorium on December 11, 1965. The headlining act for that concert was a local band, The Myddle Class.

== Athletics ==
The Summit High School Hilltoppers compete in the Union County Interscholastic Athletic Conference, which is comprised of public and private high schools in Union County and was established following a reorganization of sports leagues in Northern New Jersey by the New Jersey State Interscholastic Athletic Association Prior to the NJSIAA's 2010 realignment, the school had competed as part of the Iron Hills Conference, which included public and private high schools in Essex, Morris and Union counties. With 875 students in grades 10-12, the school was classified by the NJSIAA for the 2019–20 school year as Group III for most athletic competition purposes, which included schools with an enrollment of 761 to 1,058 students in that grade range. The football team competes in Division 3 of the Big Central Football Conference, which includes 60 public and private high schools in Hunterdon, Middlesex, Somerset, Union and Warren counties, which are broken down into 10 divisions by size and location. The school was classified by the NJSIAA as Group III North for football for 2024–2026, which included schools with 700 to 884 students.

The boys' basketball team won the Group III (then known as Class B) state championship in 1929, defeating Weehawken High School by a score of 25–24 in the tournament final. The 2005 team won the North II, Group II state sectional championship with a 61–58 win over Hillside High School.

The boys' soccer team won the Group III state championship in 1956 (vs. Dwight Morrow High School), 1957 (title awarded by NJSIAA), 1961 (vs. Paramus High School), 1969 (vs. James Caldwell High School), 1974 (vs. Ewing High School), 1976 (as co-champion with Sterling High School), 1977 (as co-champion with Sterling High School) and 2023 (vs. Cherry Hill West High School). The 1956 team finished the season with a 10-2-1 record after winning the Group III state title with a 3-1 victory against Dwight Morrow in the playoff finals.

The boys' tennis team won the Group III state championship in 1969 (vs. Millburn High School) and 2014 (vs. Northern Highlands Regional High School), and won the Group II title in 2003 (vs. Rumson-Fair Haven Regional High School). The team won the Group II state championship in 2003 with a 4–1 win over Rumson-Fair Haven.

The football team won the NJSIAA North II Group III state sectional championships in 1976, 1980, 2012, 2013 and 2018, and won the North II Group II titles in 1988, 1993, 1994 and 2009. The 1976 team finished the season with a 9-1-1 record after winning the North II Group III sectional title with a 40–0 win against West Essex High School in the championship game. The 1993 team held off a furious comeback by West Morris Mendham High School in the championship game to win the North II Group II title by a score of 26-21 and finish the season 11–0. The 2009 football team finished 12–0, winning the 2009 North II Group II title with a 28–19 win over Orange High School in a game played at Giants Stadium. The football team won the North II Group III state championship in 2012 and 2013, winning 24 consecutive games during those two seasons. The 2018 team won the North II Group III state sectional championship with a 36–14 win against Rahway High School in the tournament final.

The girls' track team won the Group III indoor relay state championship in 1981.

The men's lacrosse team won the overall state championships in 1981 (defeating Montclair High School in the tournament final) and in 1983 (vs. Columbia High School). The team won the Group I title in 2005 (vs. Mountain Lakes High School), 2010 (vs. Madison High School), 2012 (vs. Glen Ridge High School); won the Group II title in 2009 (vs. Moorestown High School), 2011 (vs. Chatham High School), 2014 (vs. Somerville High School), 2015 (vs. Cranford High School), 2018 (vs. Rumson-Fair Haven Regional High School), 2019 (vs. Somerville), 2021 (vs. Rumson-Fair Haven), 2023 (vs. Wall High School) and 2024 (vs. Manasquan High School) and won the Group III championship in 2025 and 2026 (vs. Shawnee High School). The team's 16 group championships are the third-most of any school in the state. The team won the Tournament of Champions in 2009 (vs. Delbarton School) and 2010 (vs. St. Joseph High School of Metuchen). The men's lacrosse team made it to the state championship in 2001, falling 8–3 to Moorestown in the championship game, after a 4–2 semi-final win over Delbarton School. The team won the Group II title in 2009 against Moorestown, winning by a score of 9–8 on a goal scored in the last minute of the game. After losing in the Tournament of Champions to Delbarton School in 2005, the 2009 team defeated Delbarton by a score of 8–4 and in 2010 the team won the ToC with a 6-1 win against St. Joseph High School to finish the season 23-0.

The women's lacrosse team won the overall state championship in 1986 (defeating Cinnaminson High School in the tournament final) and 1999 (vs. Moorestown High School). The team won the Group II state title in 2013 (vs. Allentown High School), 2014 (vs. Red Bank Catholic High School), 2015 (vs. Rumson-Fair Haven Regional High School), 2022 (vs. Manasquan High School), 2023 (vs. Haddonfield Memorial High School) and 2024 (vs. Haddonfield), and won the Group III title in 2016, 2017 and 2025 (vs. Moorestown High School all three years). The program's total of 11 group titles is tied for second-most in the state. The 2017 team won the Group III title in 2017 with a 9–8 win against Moorestown on a goal scored in the final minute of play at Kean University.

The girls' tennis team won the Group II state championship in 1998 with a 3–2 win against Moorestown High School. In 2007, the women's tennis team won the North II, Group II state sectional championship with a 3–2 win over Mountain Lakes High School in the tournament final.

The ice hockey team won the Public B state championship in 2012, its first title. They would go on to win the Public C state champion in 2018, 2019 and 2020. In 2000, the team surprised the #1-seeded team from Brick Township High School and eventually lost in the public school final game to second-seeded Bayonne High School by a score of 6–3. The team won the Public C State Championship in 2018, defeating Chatham High School by a score of 3–0. The 2020 team defeated Ramsey High School by a score of 5-2 to win the Public C state championship for the third year in a row.

The field hockey team won the North II Group II state sectional title in 2009 and 2014, and won the North II Group III title in 2015.

The boys' cross country team won the Group III state championship in 2014 and 2022.

=== Athletic facilities ===
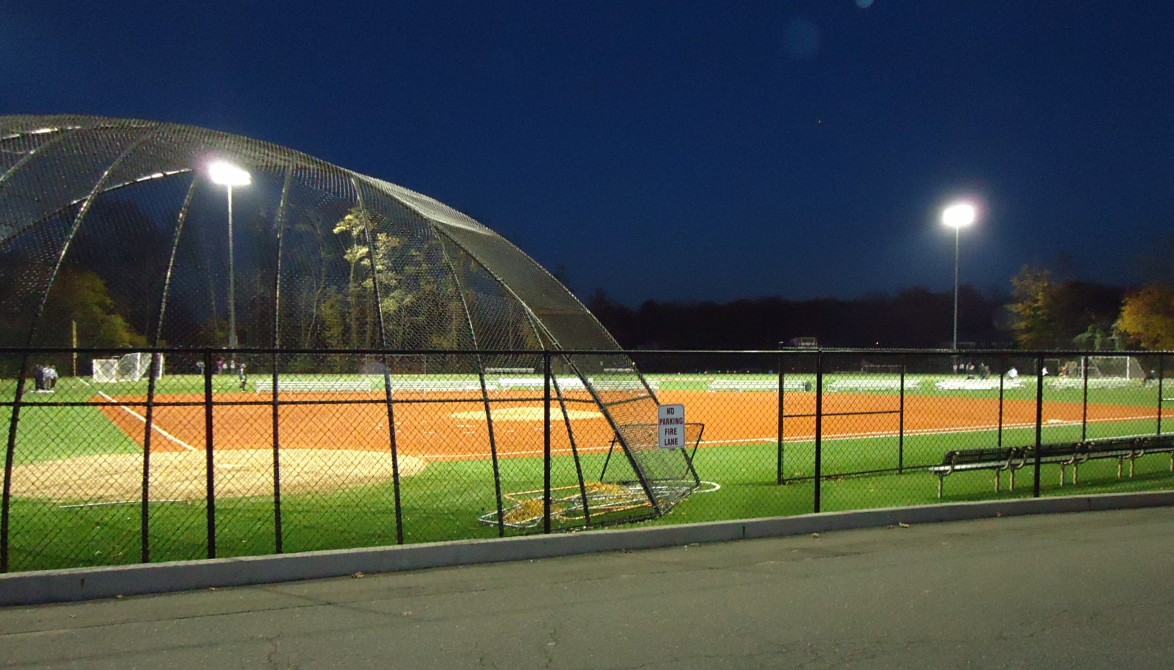
Athletic field at night.

The Metro Homes Sports Complex, better known as Tatlock Field when it was given the name officially in 2011, is Summit High School's main venue for football, men's lacrosse, and track and field.

== Curriculum ==
=== Science ===
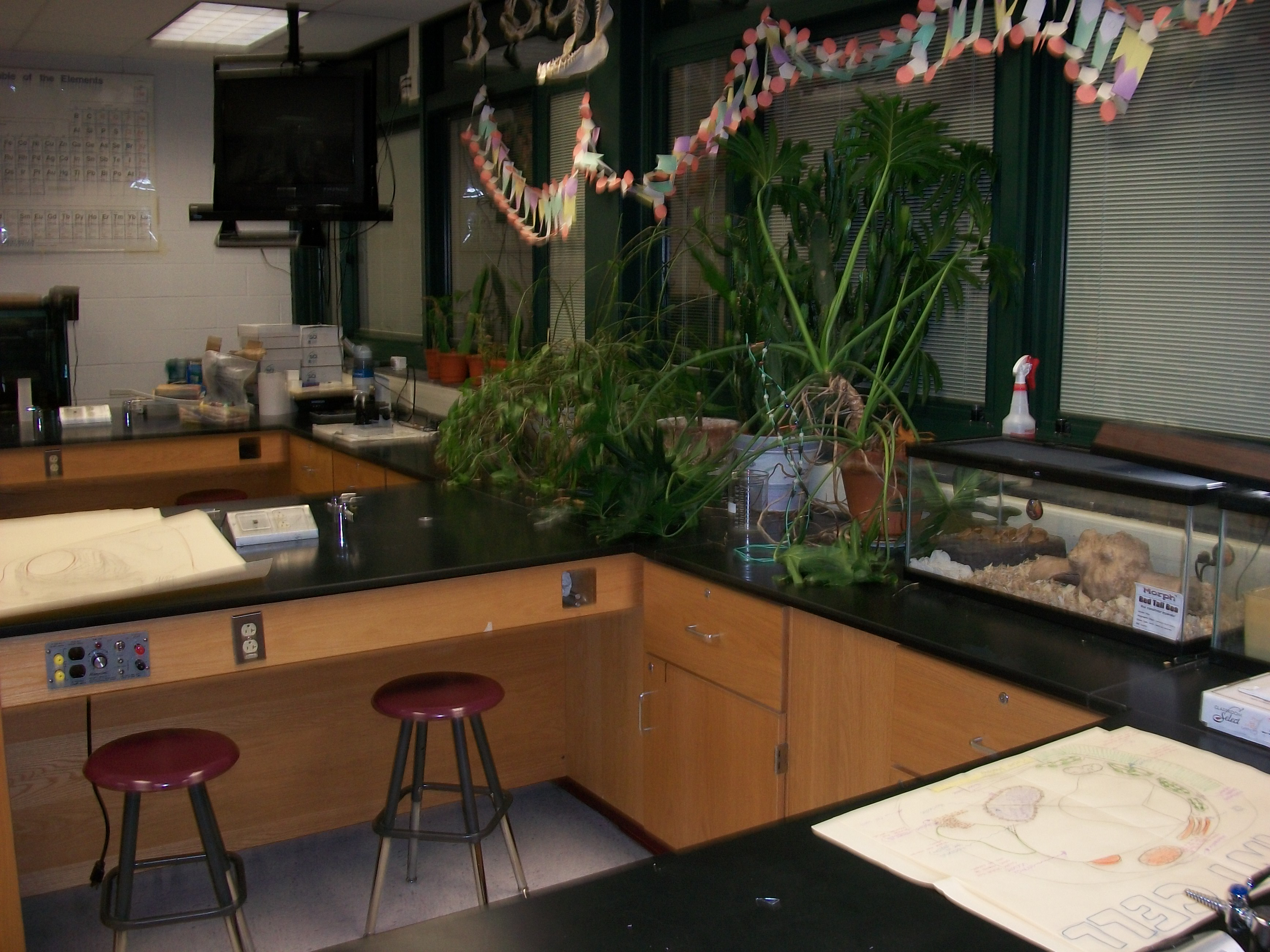
Biology classroom

As of 2019, the general pattern for students is to study physics in ninth grade, chemistry in tenth grade, and biology in eleventh grade; these subjects can be studied at different levels, from modified to regular and to advanced/honors.

Honors and AP programs require test scores or honors applications for a student to be accepted, and students in these programs are expected to maintain a B− average or better to continue in the next year's accelerated science courses. Students in their sophomore, junior, or senior years of high school also have the option of participating in a shared-time program offered through the Union County Vocational Technical Schools (UCVTS).

=== English ===
Ninth graders have a choice of a Global Studies course which will meet for two periods each day; it teaches literacy skills with literature in a historical context and combines freshman English and world history. English 1 is also offered, as a one-period course, and it will teach literacy skills including reading and writing and focuses on putting text in a thematic or literary context. The choice of which course to take should be based on a student's learning style; the Global Studies course will have more interaction and cooperative-based learning. School authorities decided to eliminate ninth grade English honors in 2009.

Journalism is taught as an elective one-semester course and includes entry-level exposure to the SHS student newspaper. Honors and AP courses are open by application to students in grades 11 and 12. And a course in public speaking will be replaced by a course entitled "21st century media and communications." Among the retirees include English teacher novelist Robert Kaplow whose bestselling novel Me and Orson Welles was made into a film.

=== Mathematics ===
The department offers a two-year algebra program. School board officials suggested that a two-year algebra sequence will lead to "increased participation and greater success," and was phased in from 2010 through 2012.

Students who progress quickly have an opportunity to take Advanced Placement (AP) courses such as AP Calculus AB or BC. The highest level course is Multivariable Calculus. In addition, electives such as Personal Finance, AP Statistics, AP Computer Science A, and AP Computer Science Principles are offered.

== Rankings ==
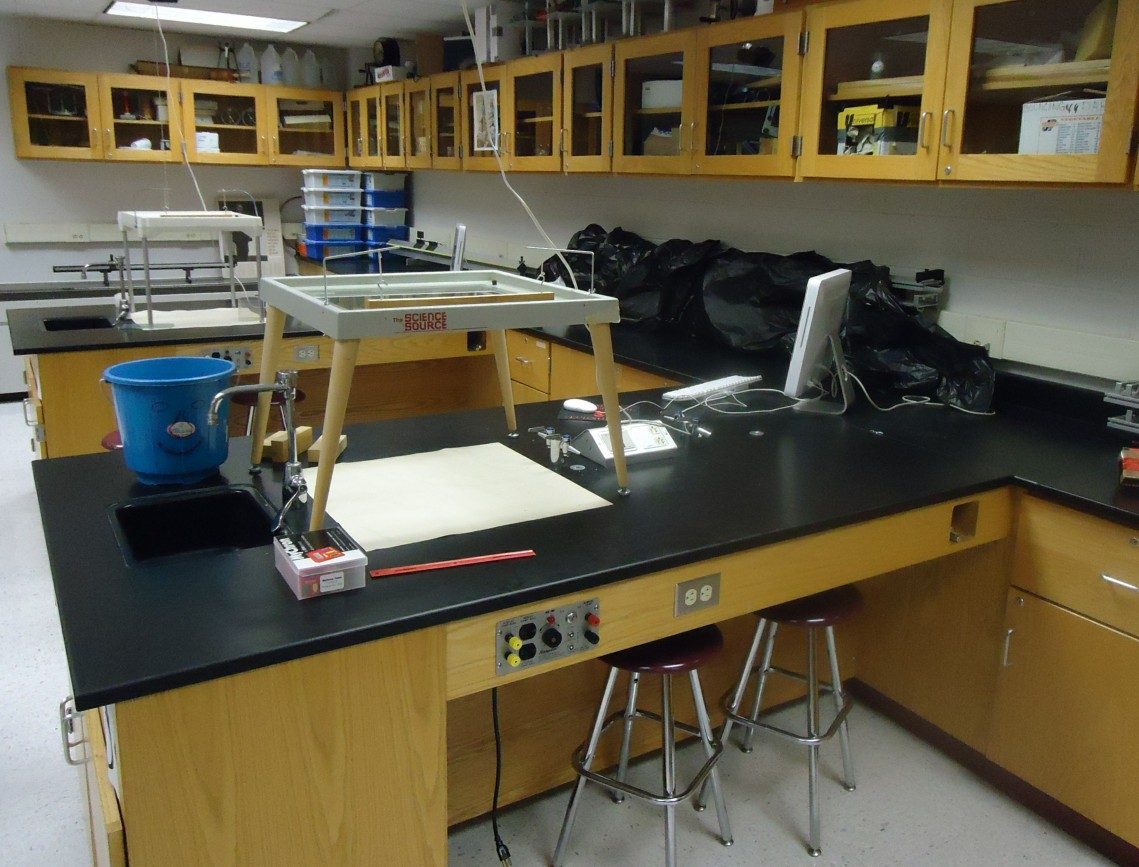
Physics classroom

The school was the 38th-ranked public high school in New Jersey out of 339 schools statewide in New Jersey Monthly magazine's September 2014 cover story on the state's "Top Public High Schools". The school had been ranked 15th in the state of 328 schools in 2012, after being ranked 25th in 2010 out of 322 schools listed. The magazine ranked the school 22nd in 2008 out of 316 schools. The school was ranked 20th in the magazine's September 2006 issue, which included 316 schools across the state.

In the 2011 "Ranking America's High Schools" issue by The Washington Post, the school was ranked 17th in New Jersey and 687th nationwide. The school was ranked 419th in Newsweek's 2009 ranking of the top 1,500 high schools in the United States and was the ninth-ranked school in New Jersey. The school was ranked 441st nationwide in 2008.

In its 2013 report on "America's Best High Schools", The Daily Beast ranked the school 461st in the nation among participating public high schools and 38th among schools in New Jersey. The school was ranked 251st in the nation and 22nd in New Jersey on the list of "America's Best High Schools 2012" prepared by The Daily Beast and Newsweek.

In its listing of "America's Best High Schools 2016", the school was ranked 76th out of 500 best high schools in the country; it was ranked 16th among all high schools in New Jersey and fourth among the state's non-magnet schools.

== Administration ==
The school's principal is Stacy Grimaldi. Her core administration team includes the two assistant principals.

== Notable alumni ==
- Michael Badgley (born 1995), football placekicker for the Detroit Lions of the National Football League
- Anthony James Barr (born 1940), creator of the SAS Language and co-founder of SAS Institute
- Mark Berson (born 1953), men's soccer coach at the University of South Carolina
- Marshall Curry (born c. 1970, class of 1988), documentary filmmaker Academy Award-winning director, producer, cinematographer and editor whose films include The Neighbors' Window, Street Fight, Racing Dreams, If a Tree Falls: A Story of the Earth Liberation Front and Point and Shoot
- Vicky Dawson (born 1961), film and television actress
- Mark Di Ionno (born 1956), journalist and writer
- Bob Franks (1951-2010), politician who represented New Jersey's 7th congressional district from 1993 to 2001
- Kathy Heddy (born 1958, class of 1976), swimmer who competed in 1976 Summer Olympics in Montreal, where she finished fifth in the 400 meter freestyle
- Ryan O'Malley (born 1993, class of 2011), tight end with the New York Giants of the NFL
- Dennis Ritchie (1941–2011), creator of the C programming language and co-inventor of the UNIX operating system
- Seth Ryan (born 1994), football coach
- Herb Schmidt, retired soccer and lacrosse player and coach
- Edward F. Wente (born 1930, class of 1948), Egyptologist and professor at University of Chicago
- Willie Wilson (born 1955, class of 1974), former Major League Baseball player for the Kansas City Royals, Oakland Athletics, and Chicago Cubs
