= Summit Middle School =

Summit Middle School may refer to:

- Summit Middle Charter School (Boulder, Colorado)
- Summit Middle School (Coquitlam) (British Columbia)
- Summit Middle School, which is part of Summit Public Schools (New Jersey)
- Summit Middle School (Edmond), which is part of Edmond Public Schools (Oklahoma)
