= Summit School (Queens) =

Approved private, special education school in Queens, New York, United States

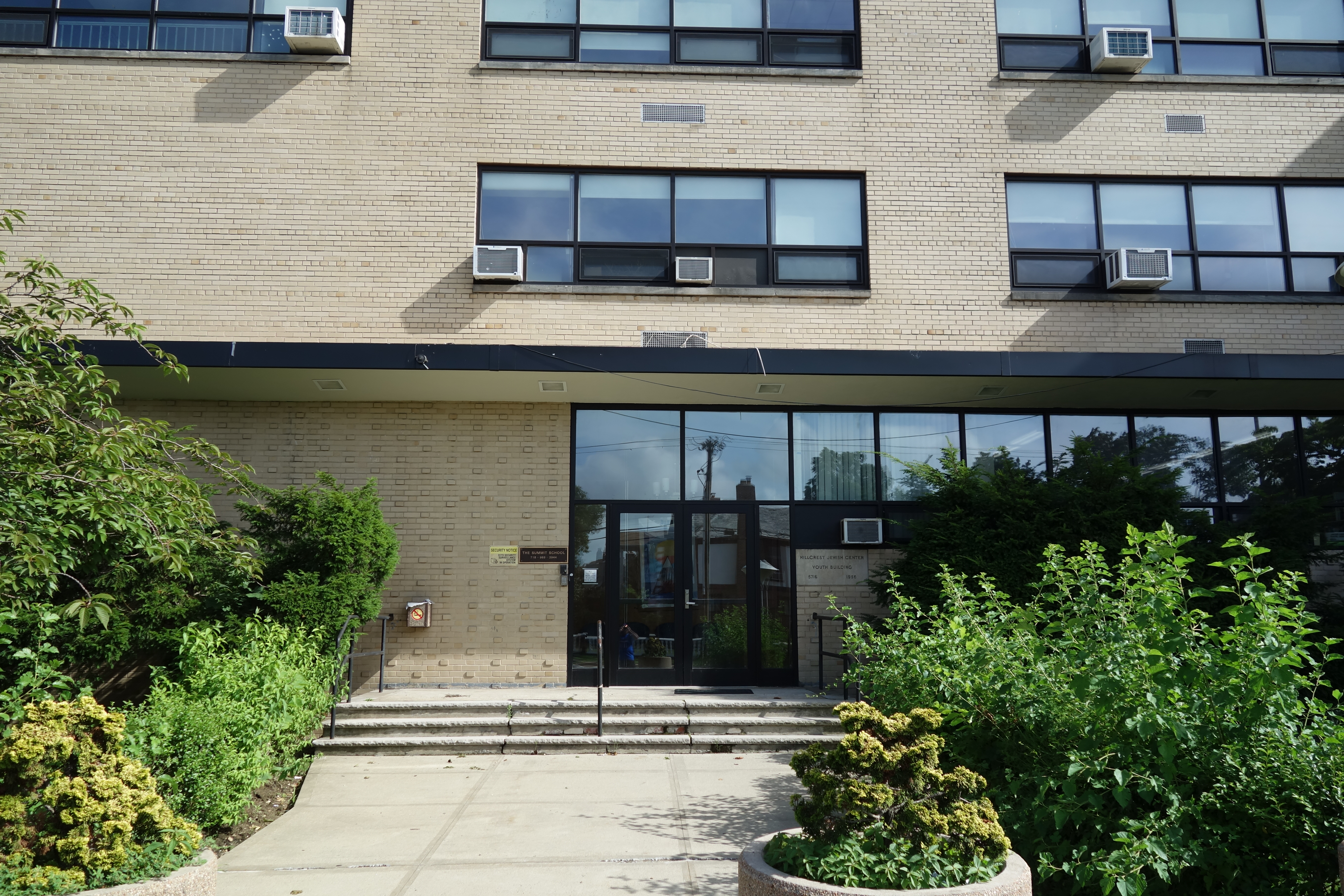
- The entrance to the Lower School located in the Hillcrest Jewish Center.

Location
- Upper School & Admissions Office; 187-30 Grand Central Parkway; Jamaica, New York 11432; United States; 40°43′17″N 73°46′37″W

Information
- Type: Approved private school Special education Day school
- Religious affiliation: Nonsectarian
- Established: 1968
- Founder: Hershel Stiskin
- School district: Queens Community Board 8
- NCES School ID: BB081358
- Director: Allison Edwards (Director/Upper School Principal); Karen Frigenti (Director/Lower School Principal)
- Teaching staff: 47.6 (on an FTE basis)
- Grades: 3–12
- Gender: Co-educational
- Enrollment: 270
- Student to teacher ratio: 5.8
- Accreditation: New York State Department of Education; Board of Regents for the State of New York
- Newspaper: The Summit Sun
- Affiliation: The Summit School (Nyack, New York)
- Website: summitqueens.com

The Summit School is a state funding approved private day school in Queens, New York, United States. Established in 1968, it operates two sites near the St. John's University campus; the Lower School, which educates elementary and middle school students, utilizes space in the Hillcrest Jewish Center in Utopia, and the Upper School serves high school students in Jamaica Estates.

In contrast to most private schools, which are independently operated, Summit is tuition-free and accepts students from all five boroughs of New York City, as well as from Westchester, Nassau, and Suffolk counties.

Summit is also considered to be a well-regarded school for students with learning disabilities, and it has a highly competitive student and faculty enrollment process.

== History ==
The Summit School of Queens, New York was founded by Hershel Stiskin in 1968 as a charter school for children and adolescents with a wide array of special needs. When Stiskin moved to Israel in 1972, his brother, Mayer and sister-in-law Ninette—founders of Summit's residential center in Upper Nyack, which is also affiliated with the school, as well as Summit Camp & Travel—oversaw the management before Howard Adams and then-Lower School principal Judith Gordon, Ph.D. proceeded as directors, respectively.

Over the course of two decades, Gordon revised the school into a state funding approved private school for bright students with mild learning disabilities, and the school further maintained its status as one of the most prestigious special education institutions in the United States. Under Gordon's leadership, she enforced a more vigorous curriculum, expanded its clinical counseling services, as well as the assistant teacher ratio, decided to have "students in each class [be compatible with] each other", and appointed Emily Seltzer to develop the school's nationally recognized pre-vocational, job training program, which Seltzer ran for many years until her death in 2010. Gordon retired in 2008, but earned the honorary title of director emeritus.

Former associate director John Renner became the director and Upper School principal, with Richard Sitman as executive director, in association with the residential school in Nyack, prior to their retirements in 2017 and 2021, respectively.

=== Enrollment history ===
According to a section of New York Family in late 2003, the school had the highest amount of student admission forms received—more than 1,000—in the city among the leading "special schools for special kids", with only 35 spaces available.

== School structure ==
=== Program ===
Students attending the school are in grades 3-12, who have average to above average IQs, but mild learning disabilities, such as attention deficit/hyperactivity disorder, high functioning autism, dyslexia, Tourette syndrome, or other specific learning challenges. The school employs a faculty of 150 professionals, including a student to teacher-assistant to special education (or related content area) teacher ratio of 12 to 1.5 to 1, and a staff of social workers, speech pathologists, occupational therapists, reading specialists, and 1 to 1 aides as needed. They "focus on the academic, social, emotional, and prevocational development of each child" by providing support in the classroom, as well as in individual and small group settings.

When assigning students into their classes, the school "take[s] into consideration age, IQ range, language facility, management needs, reading and math levels, prior friendships, and personality traits." While every homeroom class consists of 12 students, english and mathematics courses vary in classroom size between 3-10 students depending on their pre-assessed academic levels; these subjects are taught strategy-based and through hands-on learning with manipulitives in place.

Summit administers a schoolwide positive behavior support (PBS) and contingency contracting program that is reinforced through the use of point cards, a daily index card students receive entailing their individualized contract—or behavioral goal—and marked scorings for "On Time", "In Area", "Work", "Homework", "Behavior", and "Contract" during each period. Students who maintain consistently high points receive approval into the school's Honor Code program in which they have the opportunity to participate in specialized day trips and outings. The Lower School also implements a prize-based contingency management program with a school store in place where students can select prizes based on the number of points they earn.

High school students participate in a work-based learning program; they work as interns at businesses involved in the program. Freshmen, sophomores, and juniors are assigned to work in the morning once per week where they are given ongoing support from their job coaches, while seniors choose their placement sites, travel independently, and work the entire school day on Fridays. The guidance counselor also helps students discover potential career aspirations and assists with their future college planning or other post-secondary endeavors.

=== Current administration and supervising faculty ===
Allison Edwards and Karen Frigenti are the directors; they also serve as principals of the Upper and Lower Schools, respectively. Nancy Morgenroth is the director of admissions and speech and language services. The assistant principals of the Upper School are Tara Pino—also the director of the work-based learning program—and Elizabeth Breland, with Dennis Moeller having the same position in the Lower School.

Long-served Lower School clinical director Sherri Bordoff moved to the Upper School and currently oversees their clinical faculty, with Lacy Ostrander, who has been a social worker in the Lower School for a number of years, taking over her prior role as clinical director. Jessica Rosenberg has been the Upper School's guidance counselor since 2023.

== Enrollment ==
The Summit School has approximately 300 students enrolled annually.

=== Admission process ===
Parents are required to fill out an application form, provide their child's individualized education plan, neurological and psychological evaluations, social history, current report card, school transcript and prior records, as well as "any other relevant material that will add to [the school's] understanding of the applicant."

Appointments are also scheduled to visit the school, which are overseen by the admissions director. If the student is not accepted into the school, the admissions director will refer them to different schools. For the students who are accepted, their parents are obligated to sign a contract for "approval of funding from the New York City Department of Education or [their] local school district."

== Extra-curricular activities ==
The school features a student government and offers a host of extra-curricular activities, including after school enrichment programs, band, fine art, and a basketball team. Summit also sponsors annual career assemblies, and evening workshops for parents that are conducted by guest lecturers.

=== School newspaper ===
The Summit Sun, currently published every other Friday, is the school's official newspaper. The paper was founded in January 2010, and is primarily student organized, which discusses school activities, sports, current events, and opinion pieces.
