= Summit, Wisconsin =

Summit is the name of some places in the U.S. state of Wisconsin:

- Summit, Douglas County, Wisconsin, a town
- Summit, Juneau County, Wisconsin, a town
- Summit, Langlade County, Wisconsin, a town
- Summit, Waukesha County, Wisconsin, a village
