= Meadow Lake, Nevada County, California =

Meadow Lake Excelsior, Summit City
- Former settlement
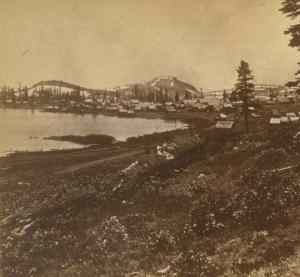

- Location in California
- Coordinates: 39°24′12.6″N 120°29′53.88″W
- Country: United States
- State: California
- County: Nevada County
- Township: February, 1866
- Elevation: 7,293 ft (2,223 m)

Meadow Lake (previously: Excelsior; Summit City) was a historic mining town in Nevada County, California. It was located on the southwest shore of Meadow Lake, about 18 miles northwest of Truckee as the crow flies. Situated at an elevation of 7,290 ft (2,220 m) above sea level, the reservoir of the same name is one of the highest lakes in elevation within the Tahoe National Forest.

== History ==
The area was first developed to help satisfy the demand for water to work the gold-bearing claims scattered in the foothills and valleys of Northern California's Nevada County and Sierra County. The area contained an inexhaustible supply of water, which could be collected in reservoirs and conducted by aqueducts and flumes to lower elevation mining locales. In the summer of 1858, the South Yuba Canal Company erected a stone wall across a 900 feet (270 m) ravine through which flowed a tributary of the South Yuba River, forming the Meadow Lake reservoir. From it, parts of Nevada City and southwestern Nevada County obtained their principal supply of water during several months of the year. It measures 50 feet (15 m) in height, 15 feet (4.6 m) width at its apex, and is built of granite. In 1860, Henry Hartley, a trapper, built a cabin in the area. In 1863, he noticed some gold flakes in granite ledges. With John Simons and Henry Feutel, he formed the "Excelsior Company" to work their claims about one mile south of the lake. The next year, the California Company staked out several additional claims.

The town's heyday occurred from 1865 to 1868 with the economy built on the prospect of finding substantial gold ore. In 1865, rumors of abundant gold around the lake began to spread. One newspaper reported that its assay showed $55,000 in gold and silver to the ton of rock. Judge Tilford, the respected author of the section on Meadow Lake in Bean's History, commented: “The writer is happy to have it in his power to state that assays since made, as well as results of milling on a large scale, have confirmed the judgment of the original locators, and demonstrated that these claims are among the foremost of the district.” Soon, thousands of miners and speculators rushed in staking out over a thousand claims and creating a boom in mining shares. Many were from the Virginia City area, where concerns had spread that the local mines were “played out.”

By late June, a 160-acre townsite was laid out by a surveyor hired by Virginia City promoters A. C. "Alex" Wightman and Charley Parker. Summit City, as it was named, was a planned community with streets intersecting at right angles and named in lettered order in one direction and numerical order in the other, and a plaza at its heart. By late summer, Summit City reportedly had 10 stores, five lumberyards, 10 hotels, five blacksmith shops, many, many bars, gambling houses, a brewery, a book and stationery store, a cigar store, a barbershop, a church, and a 10 piece brass band. An excursion vessel ferried revelers to four hurdy-gurdy houses (dance halls) at the lake's upper end. Not satisfied with a private school, the citizens petitioned the Board of Supervisors to create a school district. Soon, the Board created the Altamont school district. Summit City had more businesses than any other town in Nevada County except Nevada City and Grass Valley. About 150 houses had been erected. A stage ran daily to Virginia City and a tri-weekly Pony Express ran from Nevada City. Tollroads spidered out from the town in various directions, including to the Henness Pass road, and to the Central Pacific Railroad in Cisco. Prominent residents included Mark Twain's brother, lawyer Orion Clemens. The town had a court, presided over by Judge Jones, a jail, a marshal and several other lawyers. Nearby Baltimore Town would also spring-up on identical speculation.

In the fall of 1865, immigration all but ceased. Many residents left and the town's population dropped to about 200 people. Heavy as the snows were, the town was never completely cut off. Pack trains ran regularly to Dutch Flat and Granville Zachariah, known as “Zack’s Snowshoe Express,” carried mail, newspapers and the like. The locals passed the winter by skiing and snowshoeing. In February 1866, The Nevada County Board of Supervisors formed the county's ninth township, called Meadow Lake, consisting of 884 sq. mi. with Shasta Lake, California its center. Soon, the gold rush resumed and Summit City rapidly expanded. That spring, Wells Fargo opened an express office, and a bank was formed. Stage service to Grass Valley was increased to meet the demand. federal government opened a post office in June and appointed Melvin Wilson as postmaster. June also saw the founding of a daily paper, the Meadow Lake Morning Sun. Capitalizing on its explosive growth, the town petitioned the legislature to incorporate Summit City, with a name change to Meadow Lake to avoid confusion with another Summit City in Alpine County. The California legislature incorporated the town of Meadow Lake, effective June 13, 1866. By midsummer, the town had over 600 houses and other buildings, 4–5,000 residents. and six functioning ore processing mills, all of which had come into being the prior 15 months at an estimated cost of more than $2 million.

On June 14, 1865, the Virginia City Union reported “very rich specimens of gold and silver bearing rock, which fully equal if not surpass anything we have heretofore seen.” Its reporter Alfred Doten wrote that the rock "promises to be the richest discovered on this coast, and perhaps in the world."

The reality was that the gold in the granite ledges was often combined with many other metals, such as iron and manganese, in combinations called sulphurets, which made it difficult to extract the gold. Some of the minerals in the "rebellious" ore neutralized the effect of mercury and prevented the gold from amalgamating. Mills to crush the rock were necessary but initially there were none and rock had to be taken to Virginia City, Nevada or Nevada City, California to be crushed. The dollar returns on the crushed rock were much less than had been predicted.When the town was established out in 1865, good lots sold for $25 (~$526.00 in 2025). By late summer of that year, the price of lots had soared to $800. In 1866, fueled by continuing exaggerated reports of rich gold strikes and by an exploding influx of gold seekers, the price of lots soared again, to the $1500–2500 range. Construction of buildings continued at a rapid pace, slowed only by shortages of lumber. At the same time, that summer saw the creation of the Excelsior Stock and Exchange Board which helped fuel speculative trading in mining shares. Judge Tilford had this to say about the Stock Board: “Considering that there was not at the time a mine developed, or ledge visible, in the whole district, the transaction was unique and refreshingly cool. With solemn visages, night after night the members assembled, a long roll of stocks was called, and no bids made. Verily the sellers were many, but alas! purchasers were few! In the town the whole affair was regarded as a farce...”

As the difficulties being encountered in separating the gold from the metals to which it was bound became known, people begin to wonder whether the oft-discussed riches were just speculative. By late summer, a recession began as people started to leave the area, often abandoning their homes. In August, the citizens voted to suspend town government. The price of land and mining stocks plummeted. During August 1866, a total of about $5000 (~$83,877 in 2024) in gold was shipped from Meadow Lake, a tiny fraction of what was shipped from Virginia City. By one estimate, the $2 million investment in the mines yielded gold worth a total of about $100,000.

Mark Twain visited the city in 1866 and described it as: “the wildest exemplar of speculation I have ever stumbled upon….they have built a handsome town and painted it neatly and planned long wide streets, and got ready for a rush of business, and then - jumped aboard the stage coaches and deserted it!… A bright, new, pretty town all melancholy and deserted, and yet showing not one sign of decay or dilapidation. I never saw the like before!” That winter was very severe with snow drifts of 20 to 30 feet. The town was practically isolated. Still the residents found time for men's and women's snowshoe races, with handsome prizes. In the spring of 1867, few people returned. The newspaper suspended publication that November. By the summer of 1868, the town was reduced to a hotel, two restaurants, four stores, a brewery and six saloons, and the post office. The population was about 150. By 1869, most of the homes were empty and decaying. The population was less than 50.

In 1873, a fire that began in the Excelsior Hotel destroyed much of the town center. Following the fire, one observer reported “the site was dreary enough to glad the eyes of a broken Meadow Laker, whose chief occupation was to drink whiskey and curse the day he ever saw the place." When Hartley died in the fall of 1892, not a single permanent resident remained in Meadow Lake. For many years, periodic finds of new gold deposits, or reported improvements in the process of removing gold from the sulphurets, kept some of the mines going. But few of these dreams ever materialized. Instead, the place earned sobriquets such as "the Mushroom City" and "the City of the Day." By the 1940s nothing remained of the buildings which had once housed thousands.

=== Today ===
Meadow Lake lies within the Tahoe National Forest. The Ranger Station is located in Sierraville, California. Remaining are several mining sites, foundations, the cemetery, and the dam. A campground is located near the lake shore. Not too far from the old townsite are several rocks covered with petroglyphs attributed to the Martis people. That site is on the National Register of Historic Places.
