= Summit Township, Burt County, Nebraska =

Summit Township
- Township
- Location in Burt County
- Coordinates: 41°45′25″N 096°17′08″W
- Country: United States
- State: Nebraska
- County: Burt

Area
  - Total: 60.04 sq mi (155.49 km^{2})
  - Land: 59.85 sq mi (155.02 km^{2})
  - Water: 0.18 sq mi (0.47 km^{2}) 0.3%
- Elevation: 1,152 ft (351 m)

Population (2020)
  - Total: 403
  - Density: 6.73/sq mi (2.60/km^{2})
- GNIS feature ID: 0838275

Summit Township is one of twelve townships in Burt County, Nebraska, United States. The population was 403 at the 2020 census. A 2021 estimate placed the township's population at 403.

== See also ==
- County government in Nebraska
