= Summit Township, Butler County, Nebraska =

Summit Township
- Township
- Location in Butler County
- Coordinates: 41°16′20″N 097°18′59″W
- Country: United States
- State: Nebraska
- County: Butler

Area
  - Total: 35.73 sq mi (92.53 km^{2})
  - Land: 35.7 sq mi (92.5 km^{2})
  - Water: 0.012 sq mi (0.03 km^{2}) 0.03%
- Elevation: 1,631 ft (497 m)

Population (2020)
  - Total: 193
  - Density: 5.40/sq mi (2.09/km^{2})
- GNIS feature ID: 0838276

Summit Township is one of seventeen townships in Butler County, Nebraska, United States. The population was 193 at the 2020 census. A 2021 estimate placed the township's population at 195.

== See also ==
- County government in Nebraska
