= Summit Public Schools =

School district in Union County, New Jersey, US

Address
- 14 Beekman Terrace Summit, Union County, New Jersey, 07901; United States
- Coordinates: 40.713157°N 74.360746°W

District information
- Grades: PreK-12
- Superintendent: Scott Hough
- Business administrator: Derek J. Jess
- Schools: 9

Students and staff
- Enrollment: 3,950 (as of 2022–23)
- Faculty: 366.9 FTEs
- Student–teacher ratio: 10.8:1

Other information
- District Factor Group: I
- Website: www.summit.k12.nj.us
Ind.	Per pupil	District spending	Rank (*)	K-12 average	%± vs. average
1A	Total Spending	$18,317	46	$18,891	−3.0%
1	Budgetary Cost	14,291	47	14,783	−3.3%
2	Classroom Instruction	9,081	67	8,763	3.6%
6	Support Services	1,638	12	2,392	−31.5%
8	Administrative Cost	1,777	94	1,485	19.7%
10	Operations & Maintenance	1,415	26	1,783	−20.6%
13	Extracurricular Activities	377	95	268	40.7%
16	Median Teacher Salary	64,249	50	64,043
Data from NJDoE 2014 Taxpayers' Guide to Education Spending. *Of K-12 districts with more than 3,500 students. Lowest spending=1; Highest=103

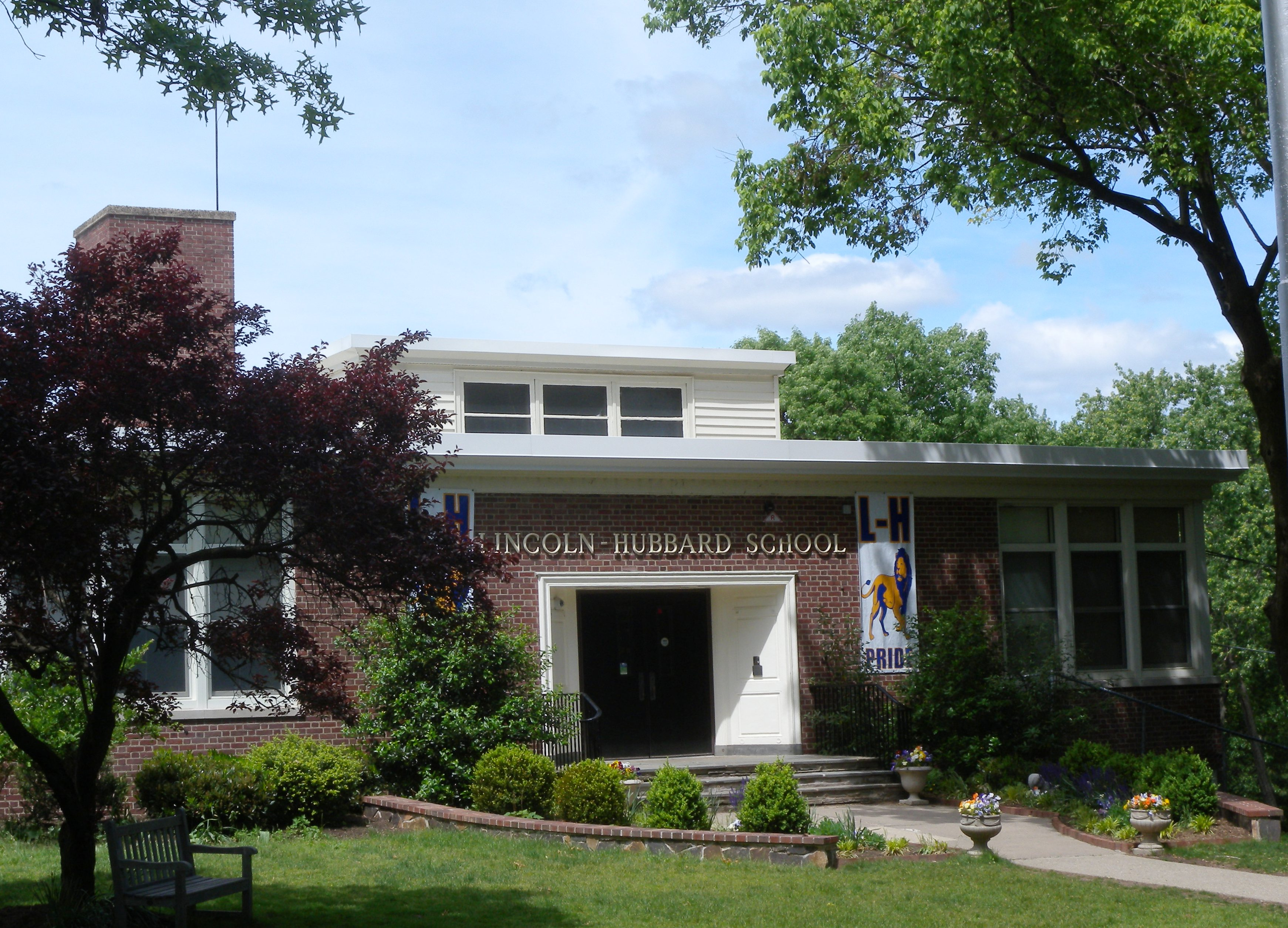
Lincoln-Hubbard Elementary

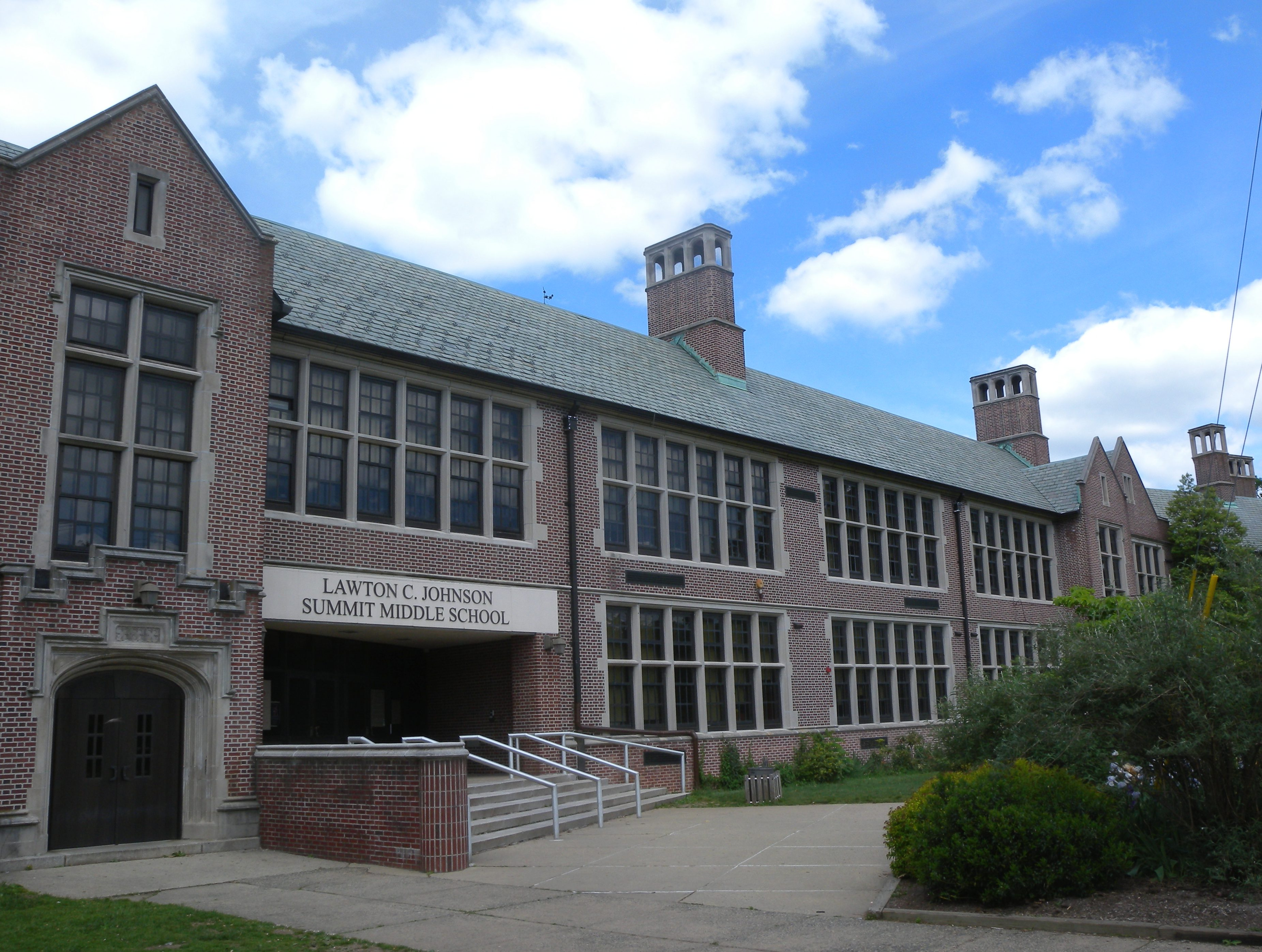
Lawton C Johnson Middle School

The Summit Public Schools is a comprehensive community public school district that serves students in pre-kindergarten through twelfth grade from Summit, in Union County, in the U.S. state of New Jersey.

As of the 2022–23 school year, the district, comprised of nine schools, had an enrollment of 3,950 students and 366.9 classroom teachers (on an FTE basis), for a student–teacher ratio of 10.8:1.

The district is classified by the New Jersey Department of Education as being in District Factor Group "I", the second highest of eight groupings. District Factor Groups organize districts statewide to allow comparison by common socioeconomic characteristics of the local districts. From lowest socioeconomic status to highest, the categories are A, B, CD, DE, FG, GH, I and J.

In 2019, Niche.com ranked the Summit District as sixth safest of 383 districts and second among 249 districts in best athletics.

== Schools ==
Schools in the district (with 2022–23 enrollment data from the National Center for Education Statistics) are:

Preschools

- Jefferson Primary Center (143 students; in grades PreK-K)
  - Evan Kozak, principal
- Wilson Primary Center (202; PreK-K)
  - Evan Kozak, principal

Elementary schools

- Brayton School (304; 1-5)
  - Shane Zeigler, principal
- Franklin School (327; 1-5)
  - Esther Loor, principal
- Jefferson School (215; 1-5)
  - Dan Healy, interim principal
- Lincoln-Hubbard School (328; 1-5)
  - Laura Muller, interim principal
- Washington School (310; 1-5)
  - Lauren Banker, principal

Middle school

- Lawton C. Johnson Summit Middle School (942; 6-8)
  - John Ciferni, principal

High school

- Summit High School (1,161; 9-12)
  - Stacy Grimaldi, principal

== Administration ==
Core members of the district's administration are:

- Scott Hough, superintendent
- Derek J. Jess, business administrator and board secretary

== Board of education ==
The district's board of education is comprised of seven members who set policy and oversee the fiscal and educational operation of the district through its administration. As a Type I school district, the board's trustees are appointed by the mayor to serve three-year terms of office on a staggered basis, with either two or three members up for reappointment each year. Of the more than 600 school districts statewide, Summit is one of about a dozen districts statewide with appointed school boards. The board appoints a superintendent to oversee the district's day-to-day operations and a business administrator to supervise the business functions of the district.
