= Wilson Brothers & Company =

American architectural firm

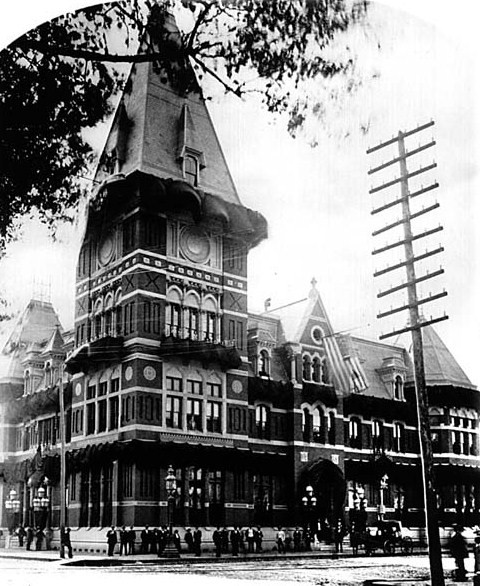
Baltimore and Potomac Railroad Passenger Terminal, also known as 6th Street Station, in Washington, D.C. (1873–77, demolished 1908); in 1881, U.S. President James A. Garfield was assassinated in the station.

Wilson Brothers & Company was a prominent Victorian-era architecture and engineering firm based in Philadelphia, Pennsylvania. The company was regarded for its structural expertise.

The brothers designed or contributed engineering work to hundreds of bridges, railroad stations and industrial buildings, including the principal buildings at the 1876 Centennial Exposition. They also designed churches, hospitals, schools, hotels and private residences.

Among their surviving major works are the Pennsylvania Railroad, Connecting Railway Bridge over the Schuylkill River (1866–67), the main building of Drexel University (1888–91), and the train shed of Reading Terminal (1891–93), all located in Philadelphia.

== History ==
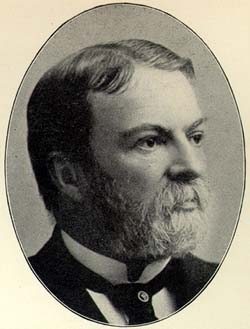
Joseph M. Wilson, one of the firm's founders, in 1901

The firm's founders were Joseph Miller Wilson (1838–1902), architect and civil engineer, John Allston Wilson (1837–96), a civil engineer, and Frederick Godfrey Thorn (c. 1837–1911), architect and civil engineer. Youngest brother Henry W. Wilson (1844–1910), civil engineer, joined the firm in 1886 and was promoted to partner in 1899. All three Wilson brothers attended Rensselaer Polytechnic Institute in Troy, New York. Joseph also studied metallurgy at the University of Pennsylvania.

Joseph worked in the construction department of the Pennsylvania Railroad (PRR) from 1860 to 1876, designing bridges and railroad structures, including several commuter stations on the Main Line. For a PRR subsidiary, he designed the Baltimore and Potomac Railroad passenger terminal in Washington, D.C. (1873–77, demolished 1908), the station in which U.S. President James A. Garfield was assassinated in 1881. The National Gallery of Art now occupies its site at 6th Street & Constitution Avenue on the National Mall. John did engineering work for several railroads, including the PRR and the Reading Railroad. Wilson Brothers & Company was founded on January 1, 1876.

For the Centennial Exposition in 1876, Henry Petit and Joseph M. Wilson co-designed the Main Exhibition Building, the largest building in the world at 1,876 feet (572 m) in length and enclosing 21-1/2 acres. The pair also designed Machinery Hall and oversaw construction of the other principal buildings. Joseph co-authored a 3-volume history of the Philadelphia World's Fair.

Joseph's commission for Philadelphia's Presbyterian Hospital (1874), may be related to later work on Presbyterian churches, nursing homes, and an orphanage. The firm's extensive work for financer Anthony J. Drexel, the city's wealthiest citizen and a Roman Catholic, may have led to subsequent commissions for convents and Catholic hospitals. In Philadelphia, the firm designed the headquarters for the Baldwin Locomotive Works (pre-1885, demolished). In Beach Haven, New Jersey, it designed the Baldwin Hotel (1883, burned 1960), Holy Innocents Episcopal Church (1881–82), and a number of summer homes for company executives.

In 1881, the PRR hired the firm to design its main passenger terminal at Broad and Filbert streets in Center City Philadelphia, directly west of Philadelphia City Hall. This was one of the first steel-framed buildings in the United States to use masonry not as a structure, but as a curtain wall (as skyscrapers do). The station was widely admired; 15% of the architects in an 1885 poll voted it one of "The Best Ten Buildings in the United States." Eleven years later, the Wilson Brothers' Gothic Revival station was incorporated into Frank Furness's far larger Broad Street Station. The Wilsons designed its new train shed, at the time (1892), the largest single-span train shed in the world.

In 1885, the Wilsons designed a high-ceilinged, 2-story banking house for Drexel & Company, on the southeast corner of 5th & Chestnut Streets in Philadelphia. Four years later, Drexel wished to expand, but Independence National Bank next door refused to sell. In response, Joseph Wilson designed the Drexel Building, a 10-story, H-shaped addition that surrounded Independence National Bank on the east, west and south sides, permanently depriving the neighbor of sunlight. The iron-skeletoned addition was built atop Drexel's banking house, and was one of the first examples of X-bracing. One of the buildings demolished for this was Library Hall, the Library Company of Philadelphia's headquarters, that had been design by William Thornton (1789–91). In an ironic turn of events, the Drexel Building itself was demolished in 1959, and a replica of Library Hall was built on its original site by the American Philosophical Society.

Following the deaths of the two older brothers, the firm continued as Wilson, Harris & Richards, and later as Harris & Richards.

== List of projects ==
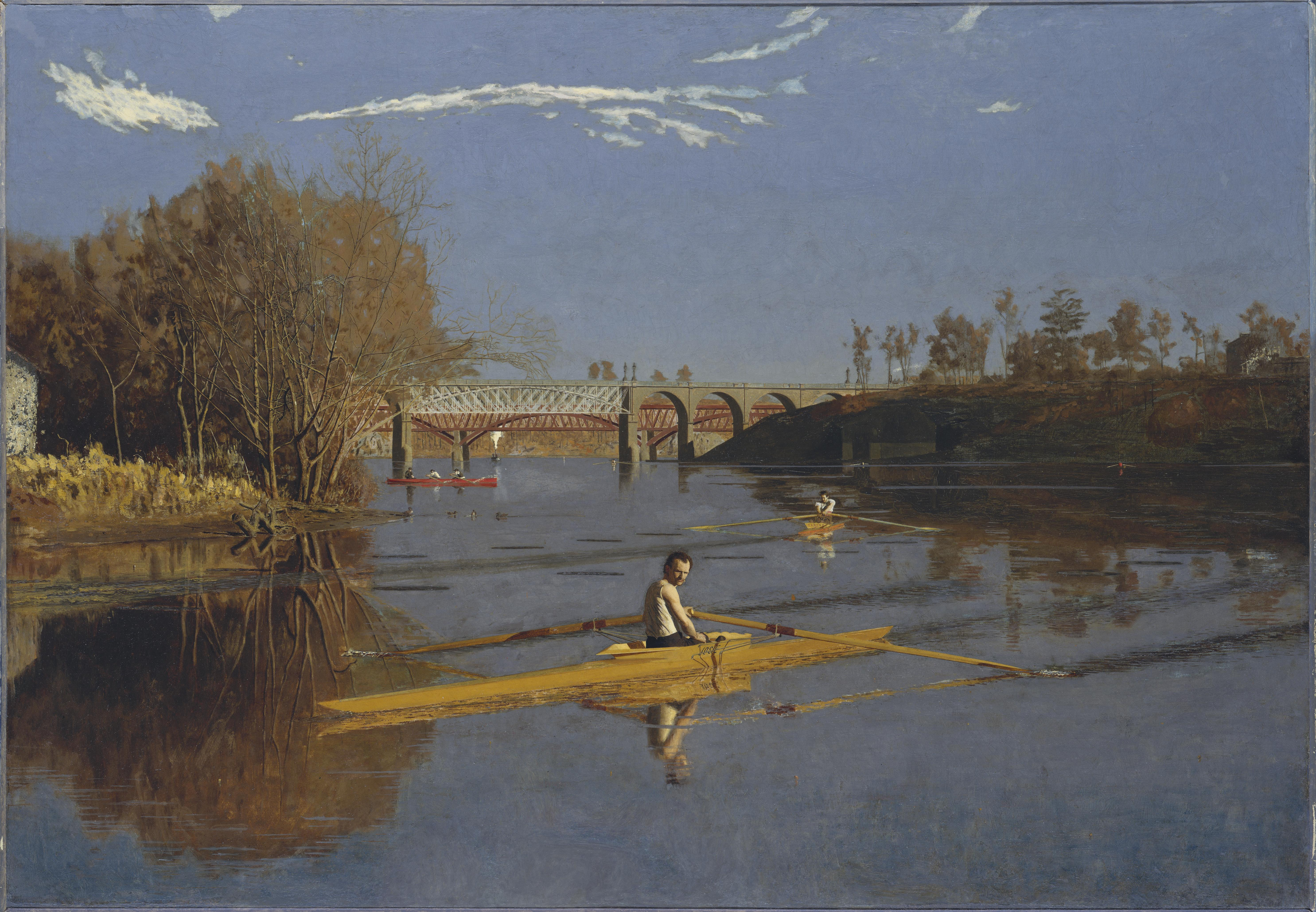
Max Schmitt in a Single Scull by Thomas Eakins (1871) with the Pennsylvania Railroad, Connecting Railway Bridge over the Schuylkill River, constructed between 1866 and 1867, is in the background.

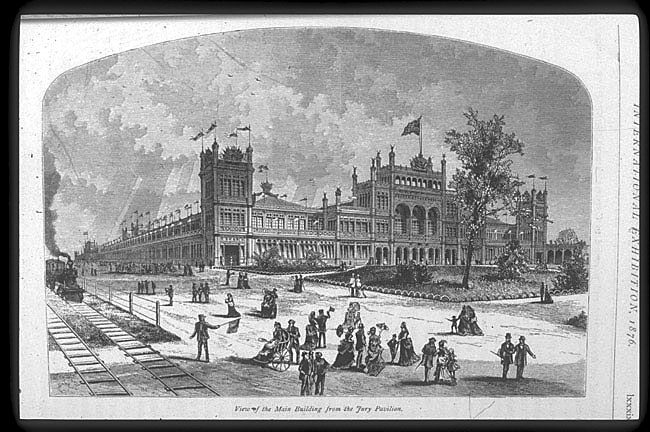
Main Exhibition Building at the Centennial Exposition in Philadelphia (1875–76, disassembled and sold 1881). In terms of total area enclosed, 21-1/2 acres, this was the largest building in the world.

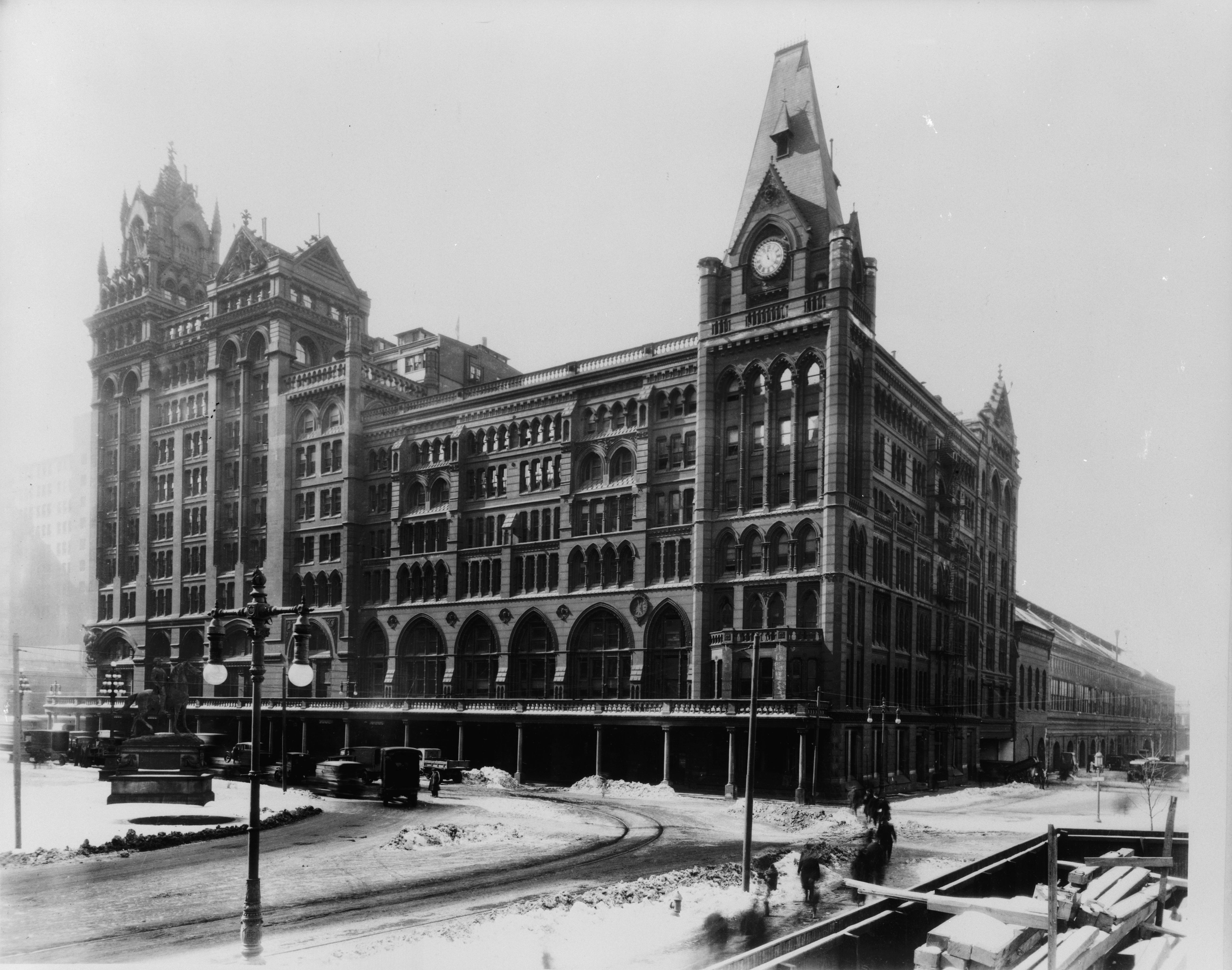
Broad Street Station in Philadelphia (1881, expanded 1893, demolished 1953) in 1903. The Wilson Brothers' 1881 station is the section at center.

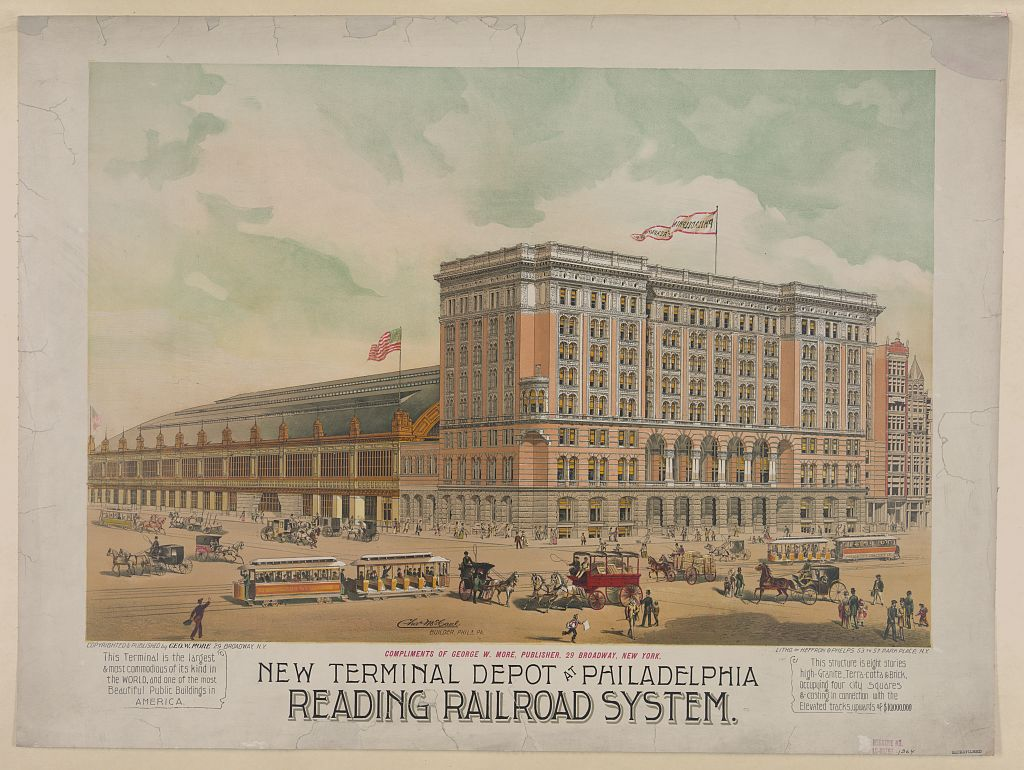
Reading Terminal's train shed in Philadelphia (1891–93). The Headhouse (office building) was designed by Francis H. Kimball.

=== Pennsylvania ===
==== Pennsylvania Railroad ====
- Pennsylvania Railroad, Connecting Railway Bridge over Schuylkill River in Philadelphia (attributed to John A. Wilson, engineer) (1866–67) (altered 1915)
- Bryn Mawr Station in Bryn Mawr, Pennsylvania (1869, demolished 1963)
- Wynnewood Station, Wynnewood, PA (1870)
- Haverford Station in Haverford, Pennsylvania (c. 1870) (some sources claim it was built in 1880)
- Bryn Mawr Hotel, Bryn Mawr, Pennsylvania (1871, burned 1889, replaced by 1890 Frank Furness hotel)
- Ardmore Station in Ardmore, Pennsylvania (pre-1874, demolished)
- Broad Street Station in Philadelphia (1881, expanded by Frank Furness 1892–93, demolished 1953)
- Wayne Railroad Station, Jct. of N. Wayne Ave. and Station Rd. Wayne, Pennsylvania (1884), NRHP-listed.
- Pennsylvania Railroad Bridge over Delaware River, Trenton, NJ (pre-1885, demolished)
- Pennsylvania Railroad Bridge over Susquehanna River, west of Harrisburg, PA (pre-1885, demolished)
- Train shed for expanded Broad Street Station, Philadelphia, PA (1892, burned 1923).

==== Philadelphia Buildings ====
- Reading Railroad Overpass (John A. Wilson, engineer) (1871)
- Spring Garden Pumping Station, East River Drive, Fairmount Park (Joseph M. Wilson, architect) (pre-1874, demolished)
- Presbyterian Hospital (Joseph M. Wilson, architect) (1874, demolished)
- Joseph D. Potts house alterations (Joseph M. Wilson, architect) (1876), formally WXPN-FM, and now the University of Pennsylvania Press
- A.J. Holman and Company, 1222–26 Arch St. (1881), NRHP-listed.
- St. Andrew Episcopal Church, now St. Andrew & St. Monica Episcopal Church, Powelton Village (1883–85, rebuilt after 1897 fire)
- Presbyterian Home for Aged Couples and Men (pre-1885, demolished 2006)
- Drexel & Company Banking House, SE corner 5th & Chestnut Sts. (1885, expanded 1889, demolished 1959).
- Drexel Institute of Technology, now Main Building, Drexel University (1888–91)
- Home for Indigent Women, now Ralston House (1889)
- Pennsylvania School for the Deaf, 7500 Germantown Ave. (1890), NRHP-listed.
- George W. Childs Drexel mansion (1891), now Alpha Tau Omega fraternity, University of Pennsylvania
- Reading Terminal Trainshed (1891–93), NRHP-listed.
- Physicians & Dentists Office Building, 1830–32 Chestnut Street (1896), NRHP-listed.
- Philadelphia Commercial Museum (1897–99, demolished)
- United Gas Improvement Company Office Building (1898)
- Land Title Building, 608–10 Chestnut Street (1899)
- Wayne Junction Station (Reading Railroad), 4481 Wayne Avenue (1899–1900), NRHP-listed.

==== 1876 Centennial Exposition ====
- Memorial Hall (Herman Schwarzmann, architect; Joseph M. Wilson, engineer) (1875–76)
- Main Exhibition Building (Henry Petit, architect; Joseph M. Wilson, engineer) (1875–76, disassembled and sold 1881)
- Machinery Hall (Henry Petit, architect; Joseph M. Wilson, engineer) (1875–76, disassembled and sold 1881)

==== Other Pennsylvania buildings ====
- Central Railroad of New Jersey Station, Jim Thorpe, PA (1888), NRHP-listed.
- State Hospital for the Insane, Norristown, PA (1878–80)
- Reading Railroad Station, Lebanon, Pennsylvania (1900), NRHP-listed.
- Central Railroad of New Jersey Freight Station, 602 W. Lackawanna Ave Scranton, PA (1891), NRHP-listed.
- Morton station renovation in 1880 (orig.1867). The design is believed to have been inspired by the Glen Mills Station, on the West Chester Railroad.
- Quakertown Passenger and Freight Station, Front and East Broad Sts. Quakertown, PA (1889), NRHP-listed.
- "Chetwynd" (John H. Converse house), Lancaster Pike, Rosemont, PA (1882–83, expanded 1887 & 1890, demolished). Converse was a partner in Baldwin Locomotive Works.

=== Buildings outside Pennsylvania ===
==== New Jersey ====
- Baldwin Hotel, Beach Haven, NJ (1883, burned 1960)
- Portia Cottage, 123 Coral Street, Beach Haven NJ
- Dr. Edward H. Williams House, 506 S. Atlantic Ave. Beach Haven, NJ (1886), NRHP-listed. Now Williams Cottage Inn.
- Converse Cottage, 504 Atlantic Ave. Beach Haven, NJ (1890), NRHP-listed.
- Holy Innocents Episcopal Church, Beach Haven, NJ (1881–82), now Long Beach Island Museum. Part of Beach Haven Historic District.
- Tuckahoe Station, Railroad Ave. Tuckahoe, NJ (1894), NRHP-listed.

==== New York ====
- Milton Railroad Station, 41 Dock Rd. Milton, NY (1883), NRHP-listed.
- Astronomical Observatory, U.S. Military Academy, West Point, NY (pre-1885)
- St. Hubert's Inn, St. Huberts, NY (1890), now Ausable Club, Adirondack Mountain Reserve. NRHP-listed

==== Virginia ====
- Union Station Train Shed, Richmond, VA (1900) at Historic American Buildings Survey
- Leander McCormick Observatory, 600 McCormick Rd. Charlottesville, VA (1884, with Warner & Swasey;Spooner), NRHP-listed.
- Main Street Station, Richmond, Virginia (1901) (as Wilson, Harris and Richards)

==== Vermont ====
- Norman Williams Public Library, Woodstock, VT (1883–84)
- Williams Science Hall, University of Vermont, Burlington, VT, (1894–96).

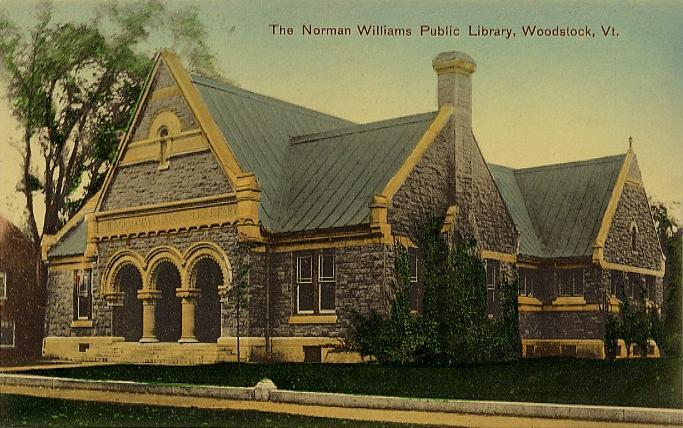
Norman Williams Public Library, Woodstock, Vermont

==== Illinois ====
- Riverbank Laboratories, 1512 Batavia Ave. Geneva, IL (1912), NRHP-listed.
- Geneva, Illinois: Buildings in the Central Geneva Historic District and the North Geneva Historic District.

==== Other locations ====
- Baltimore & Potomac Railroad Passenger Terminal (6th Street Station), Washington, DC (1873–77, demolished 1908)
- Stewart Hall, West Virginia University campus Morgantown, WV (1900–02), NRHP-listed.
- Elliott Building, 1401 Woodward Ave. Detroit, Mi(1894): Building in the Lower Woodward Avenue Historic District.
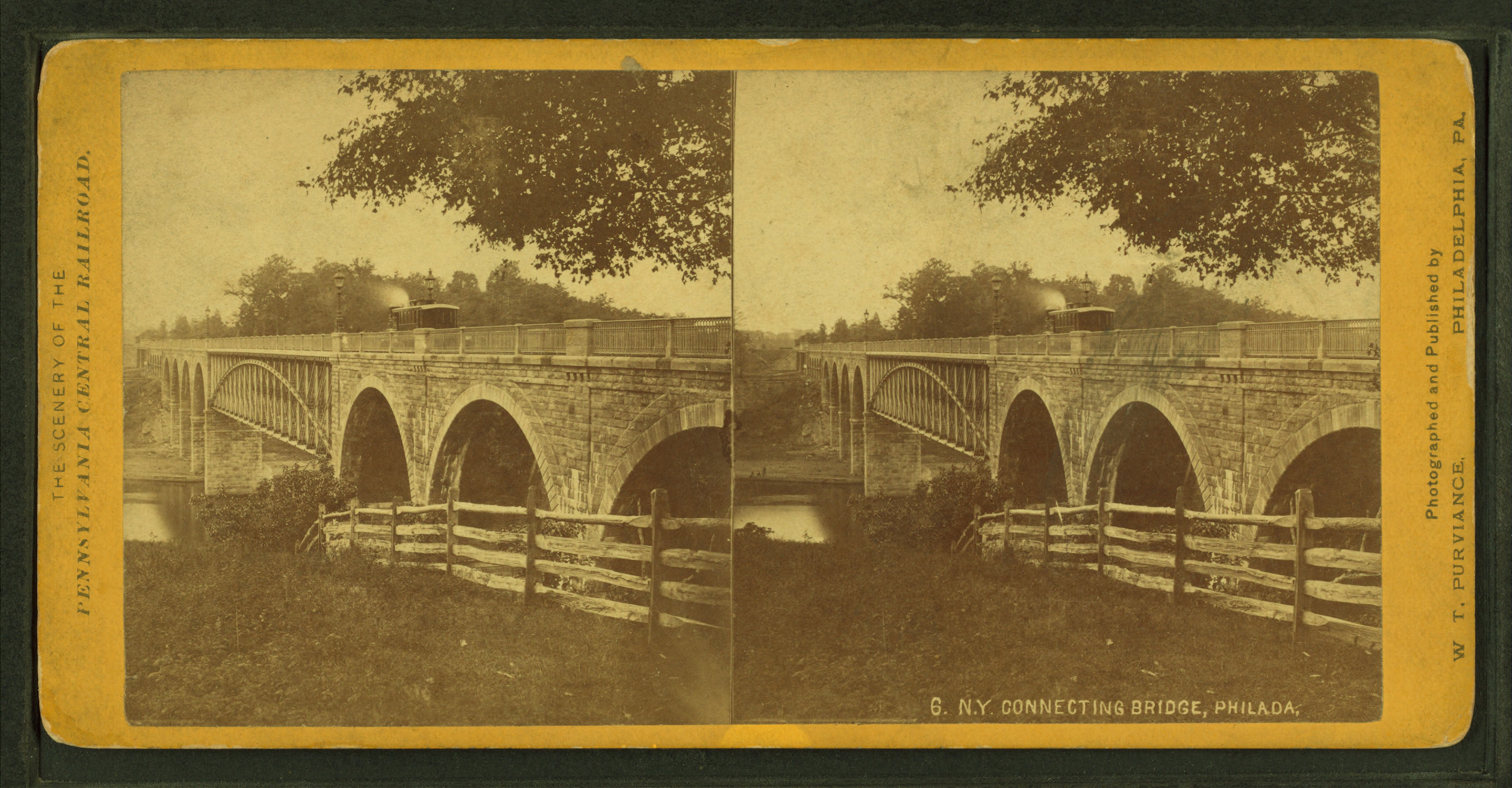
Pennsylvania Railroad, Connecting Railway Bridge over Schuylkill River (1866–67), John A. Wilson, engineer. This 2-track bridge was widened to 5 tracks in 1915.

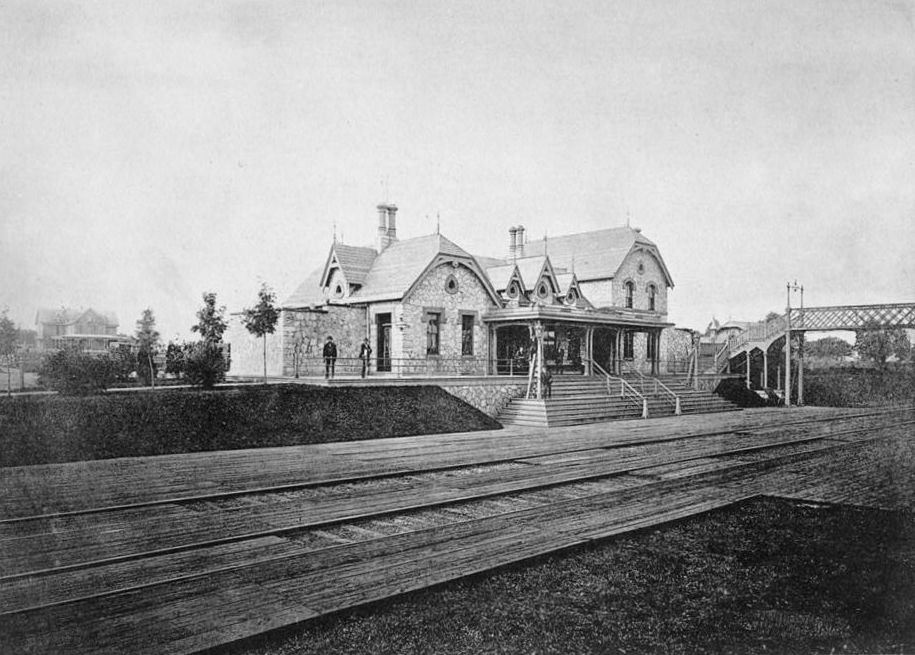
Bryn Mawr Station, Pennsylvania Railroad, Bryn Mawr, PA (1869, demolished 1963).

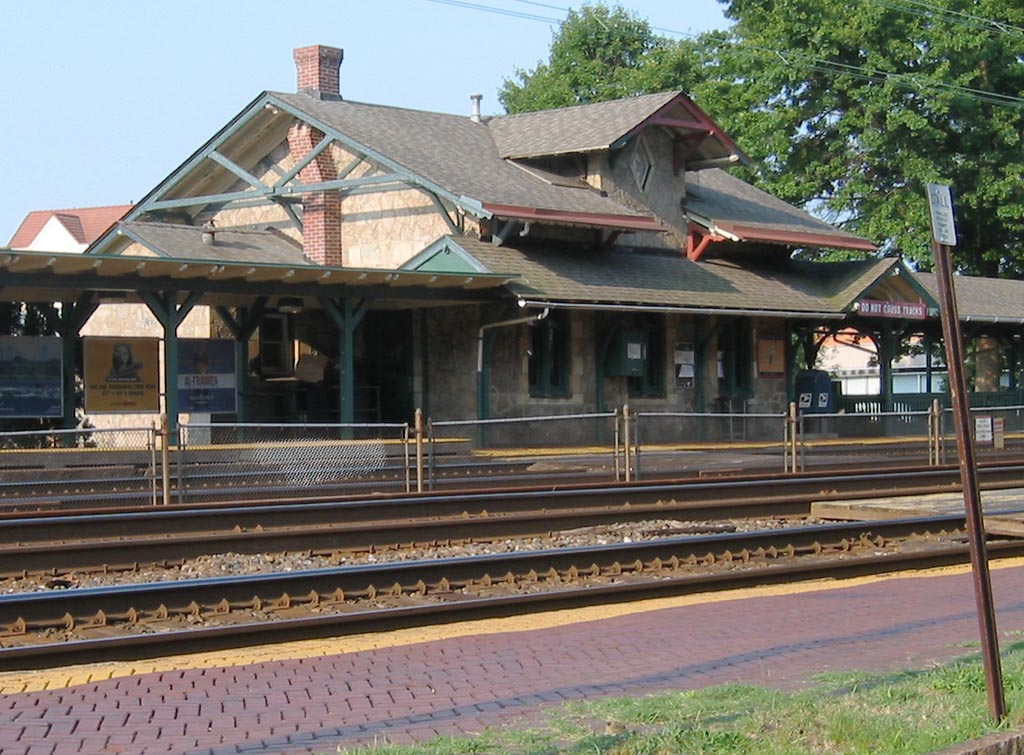
Wynnewood Station, Pennsylvania Railroad, Wynnewood, PA (1870).

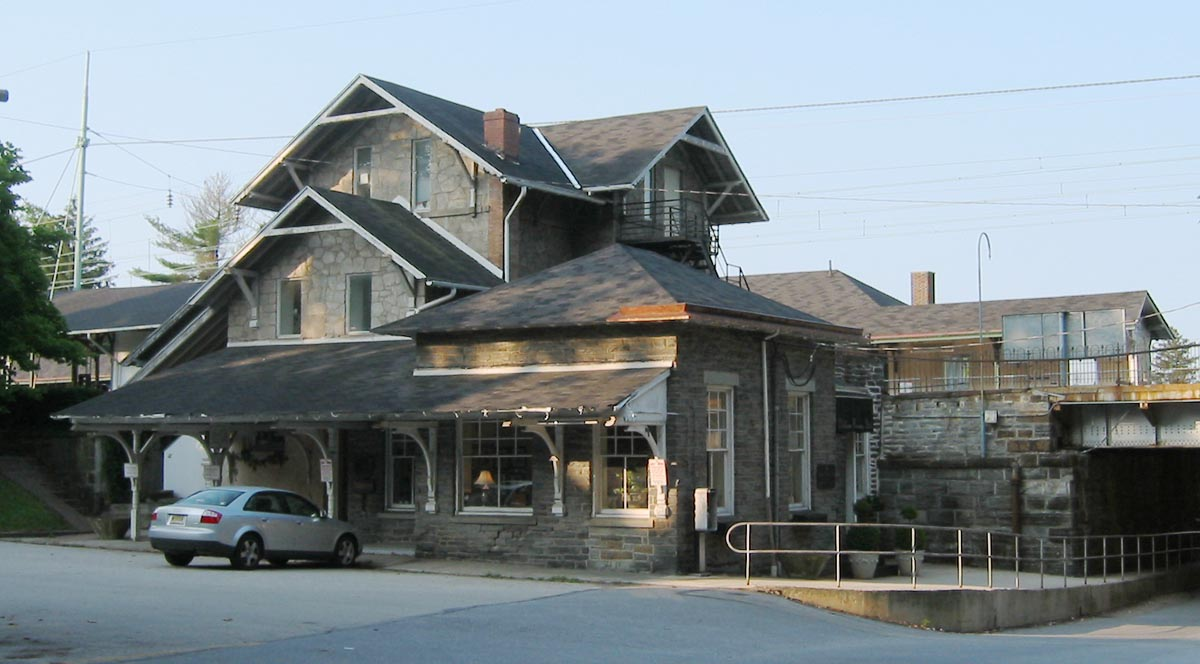
Haverford Station, Pennsylvania Railroad, Haverford, PA (c. 1870).

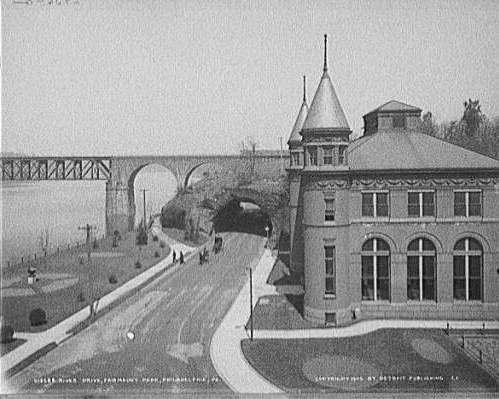
Spring Garden Pumping Station, East River Drive, Philadelphia, PA (pre-1874, demolished pre-1915). John A. Wilson's Pennsylvania Railroad Connecting Bridge (1866–67) can be seen in the background.

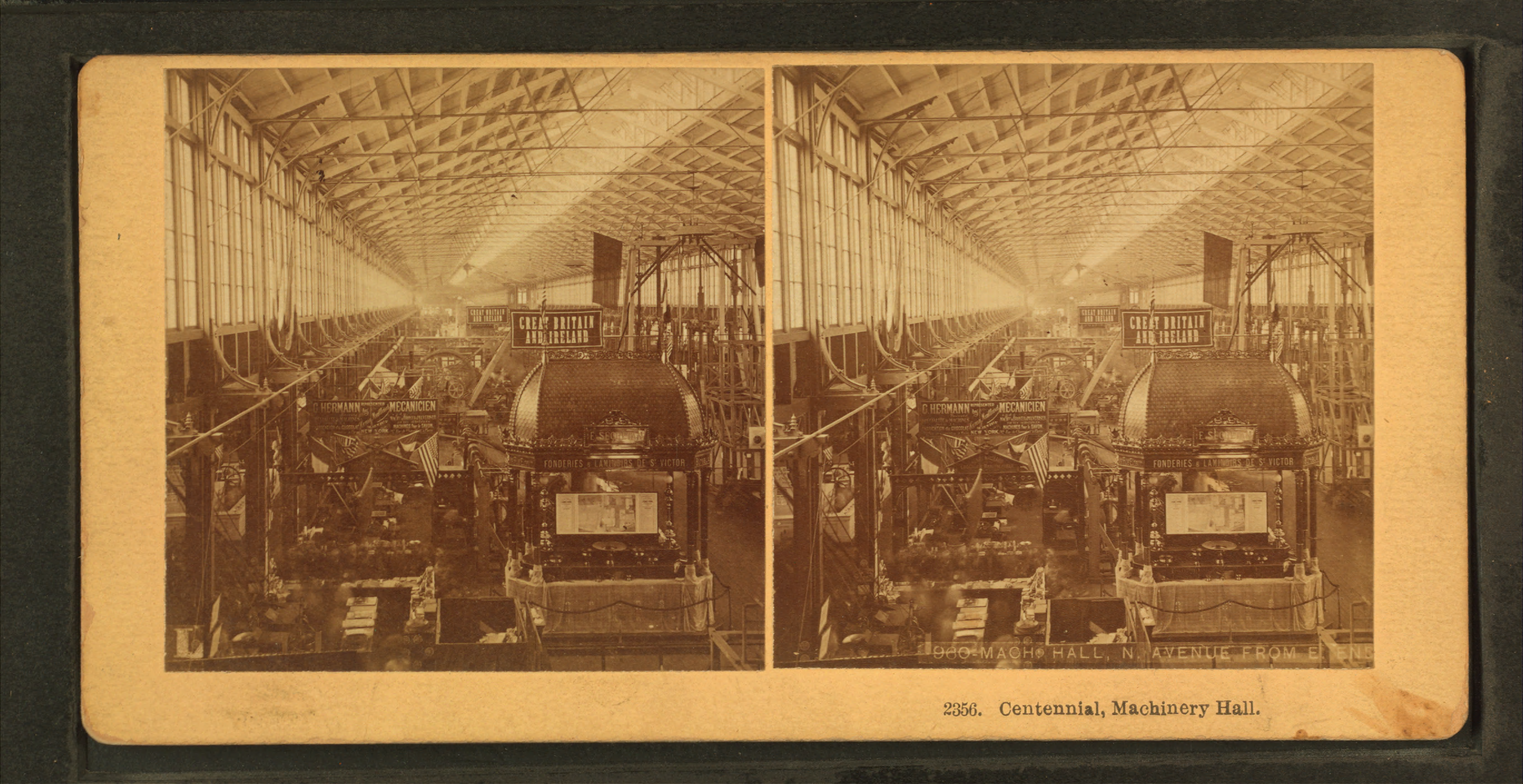
Interior of Machinery Hall, Centennial Exposition (1875–76, demolished 1881).

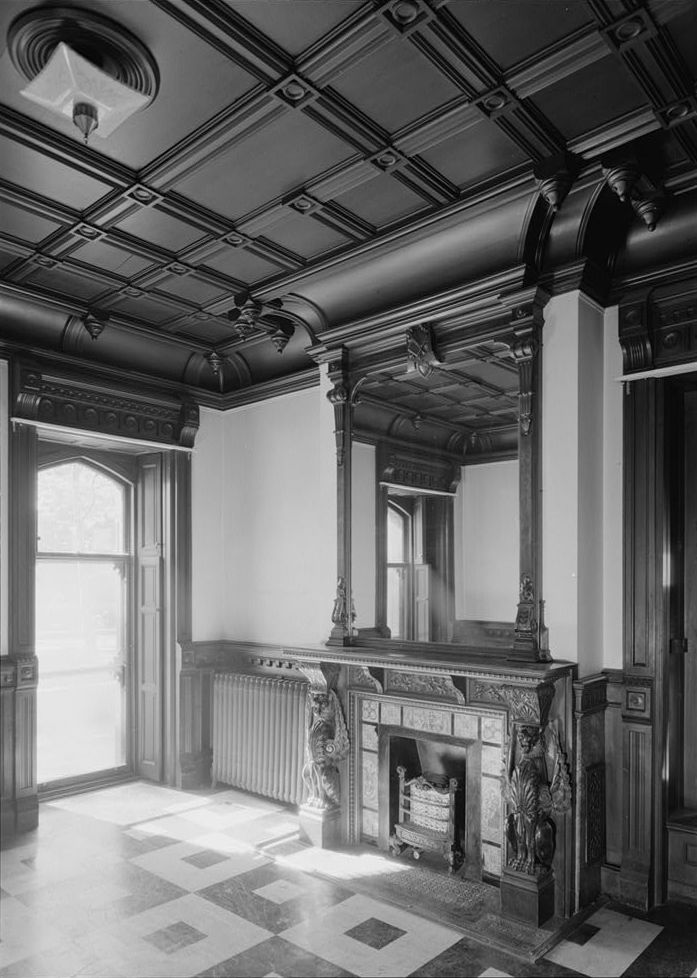
Interior of Joseph D. Potts house, 3905 Spruce St., Philadelphia, PA (1850, altered by Joseph M. Wilson 1876), now WXPN-FM, University of Pennsylvania.

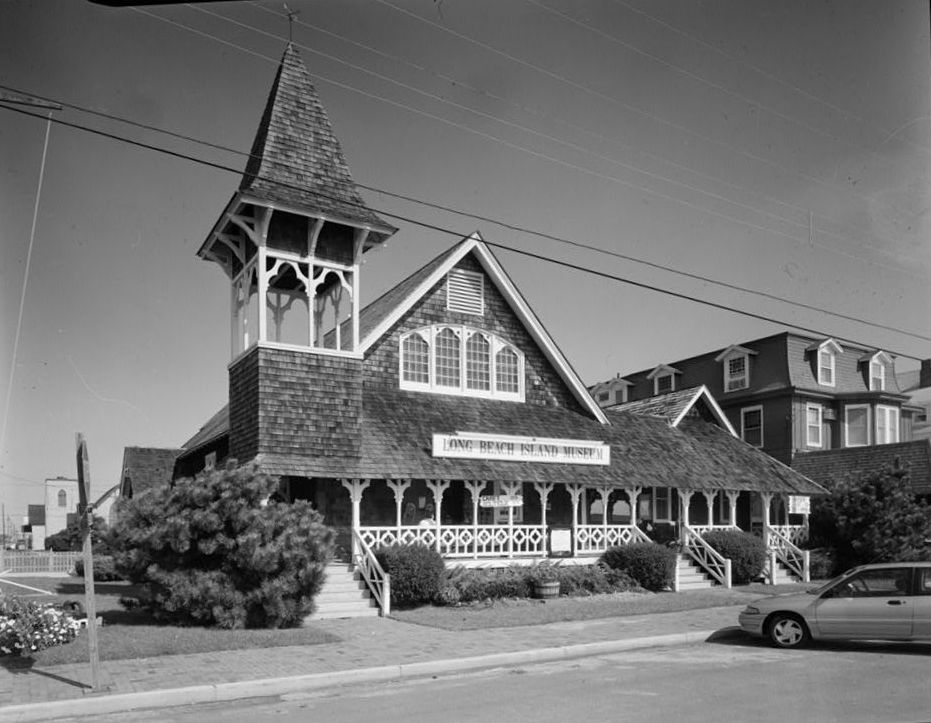
Holy Innocents Episcopal Church, Beach Haven, NJ (1881–82), now Long Beach Island Historical Society and Museum.

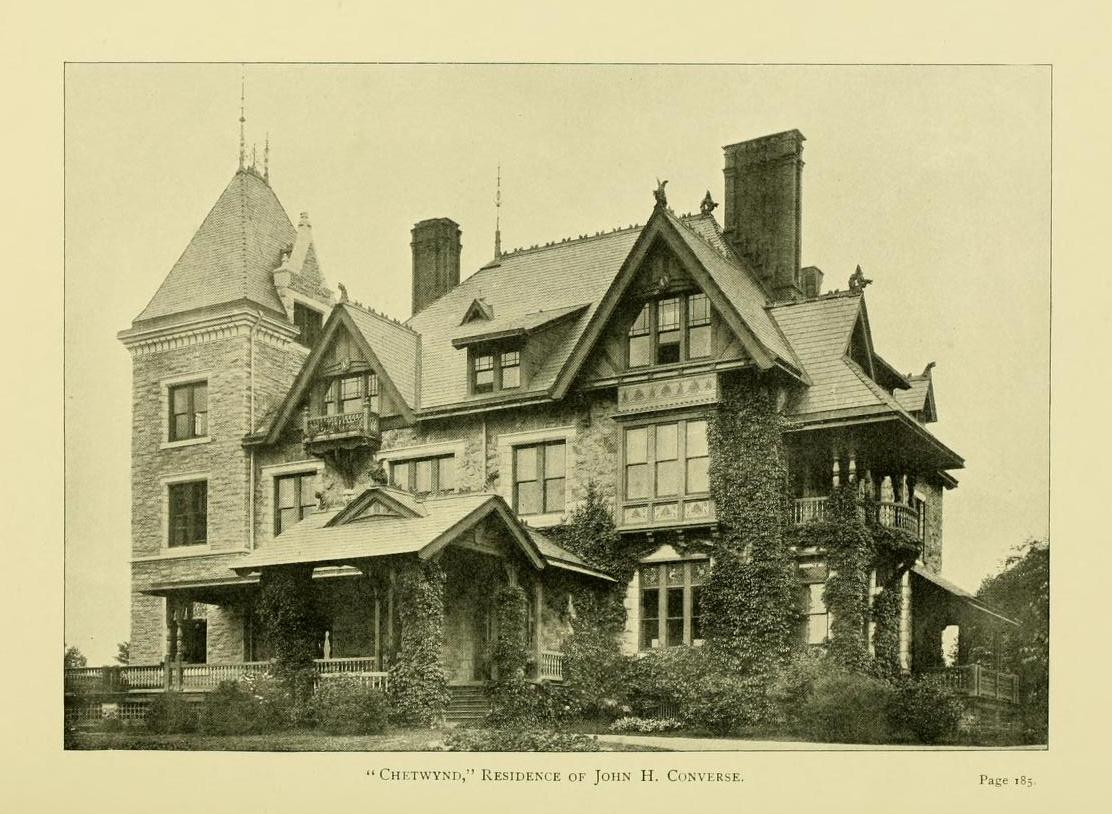
"Chetwynd" (John H. Converse house), Rosemont, PA (1882–83, expanded 1887 & 1890, demolished 1960s).

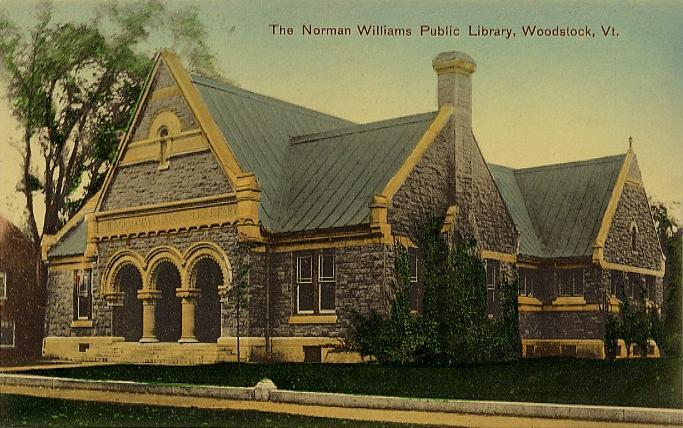
Norman Williams Public Library, Woodstock, Vermont (1883–84).

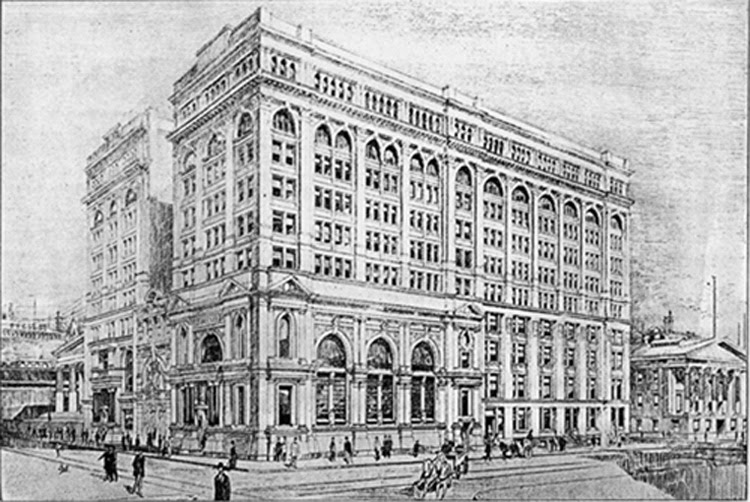
Drexel & Company Banking House, SE corner 5th & Chestnut Sts., Philadelphia, PA (1885, expanded 1889, demolished 1959).

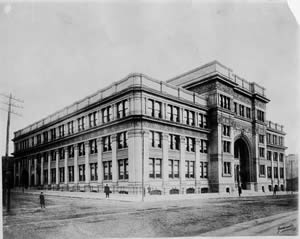
Main Building, Drexel University, Philadelphia, PA (1888–91).

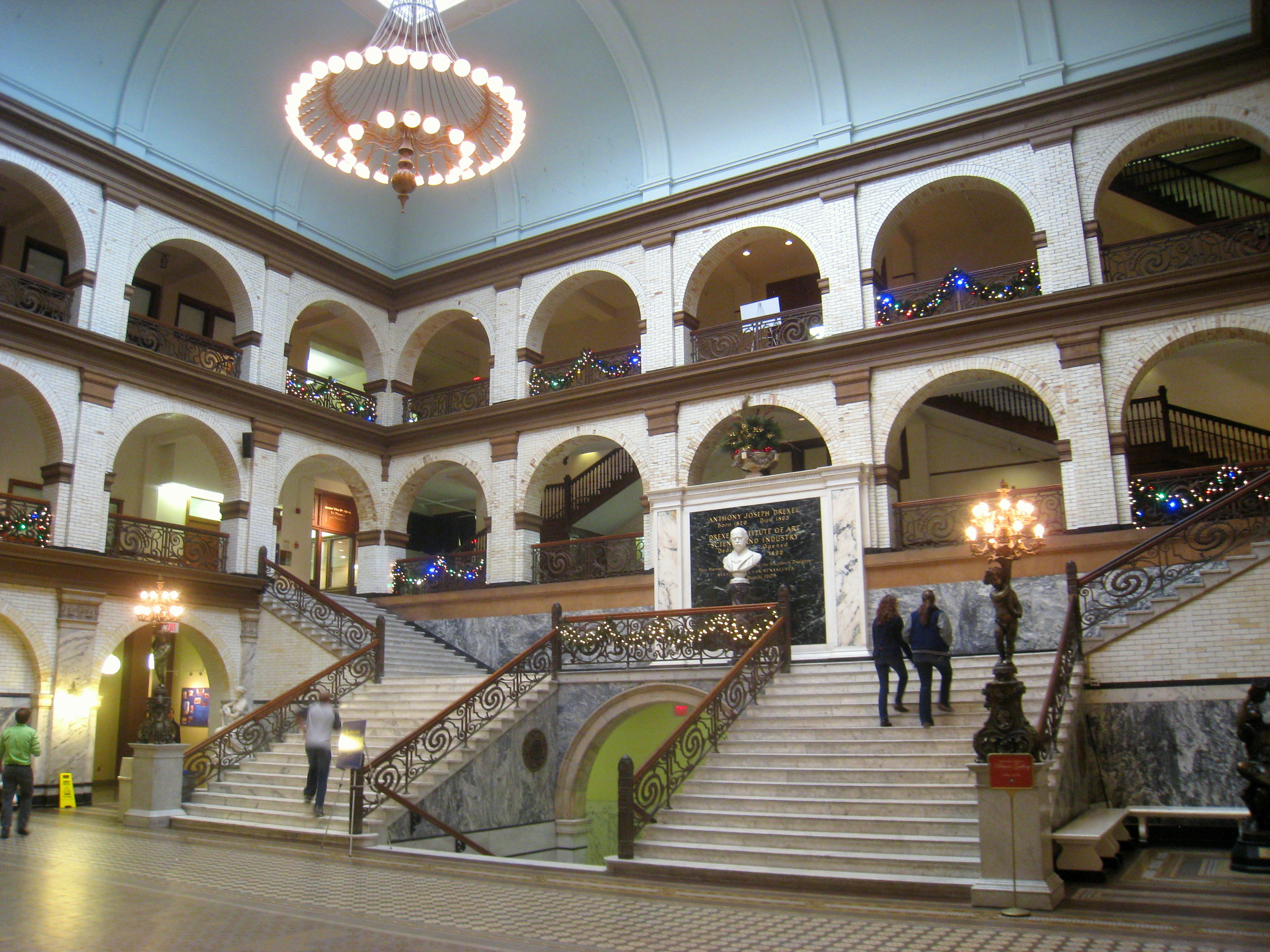
Interior, Main Building, Drexel University.

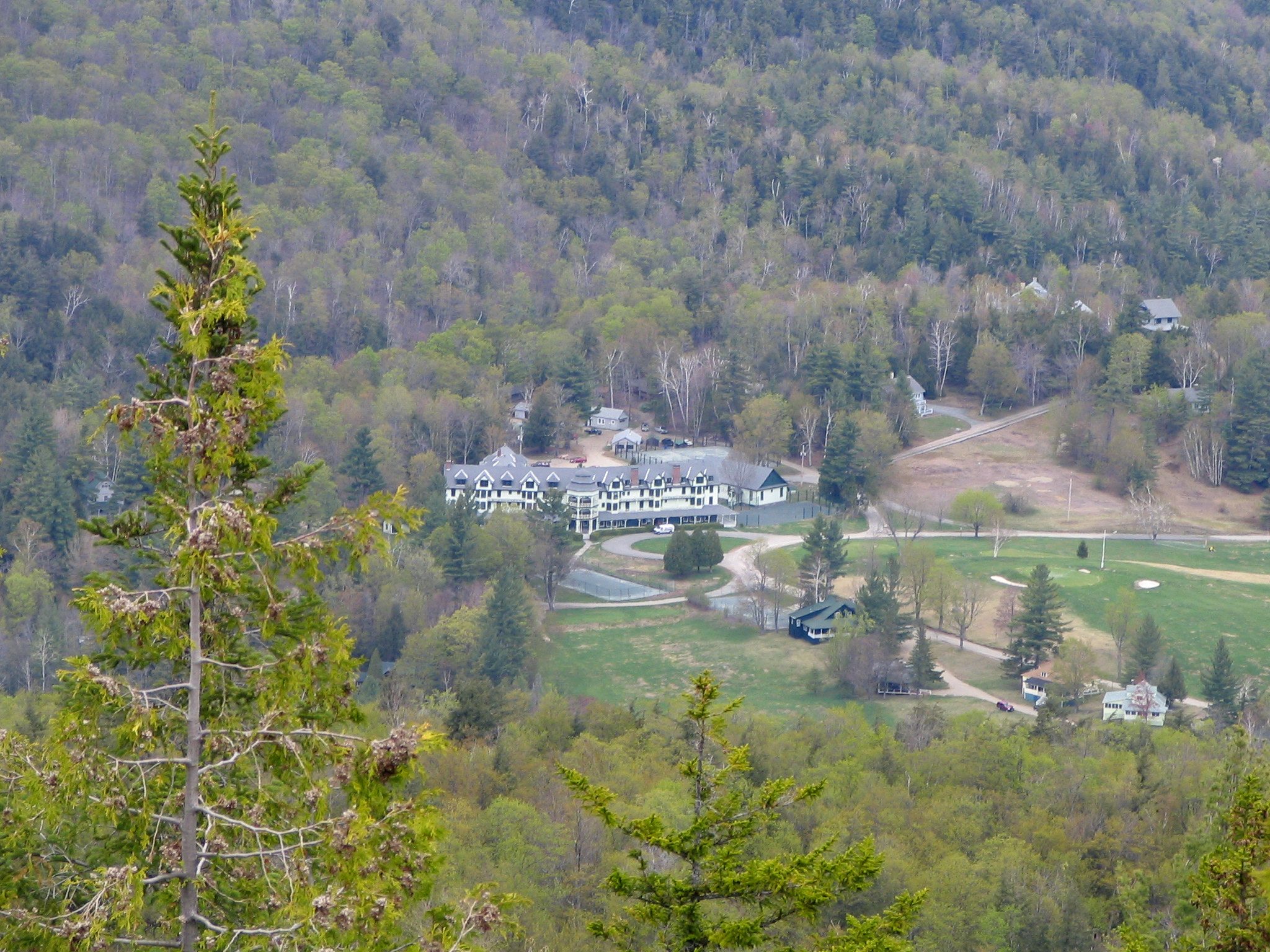
St. Hubert's Inn, St. Huberts, NY (1890), (now Ausable Club, Adirondack Mountain Reserve).

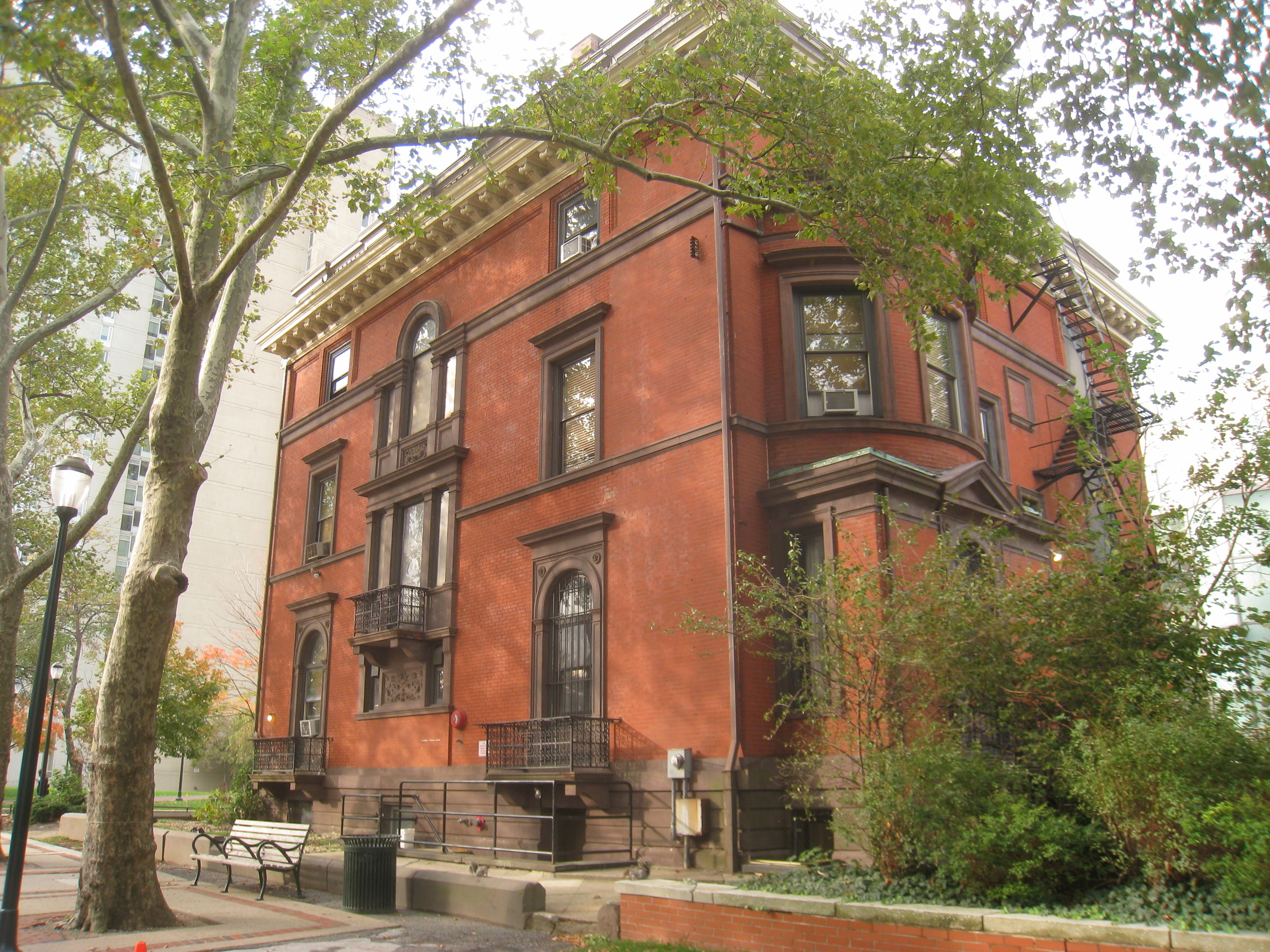
George W. Childs Drexel mansion (now Alpha Tau Omega Fraternity), University of Pennsylvania, Philadelphia, PA (1891).

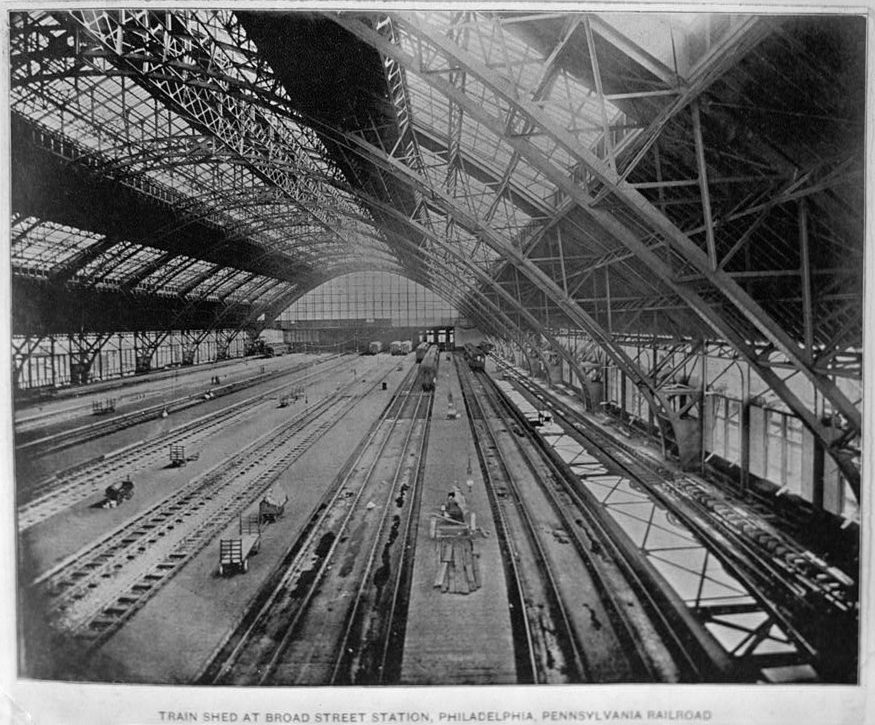
Broad Street Station trainshed, Philadelphia, PA (1892–94, burned 1923). This had the largest single span, 306 ft. (91 m.), of any trainshed in the world.

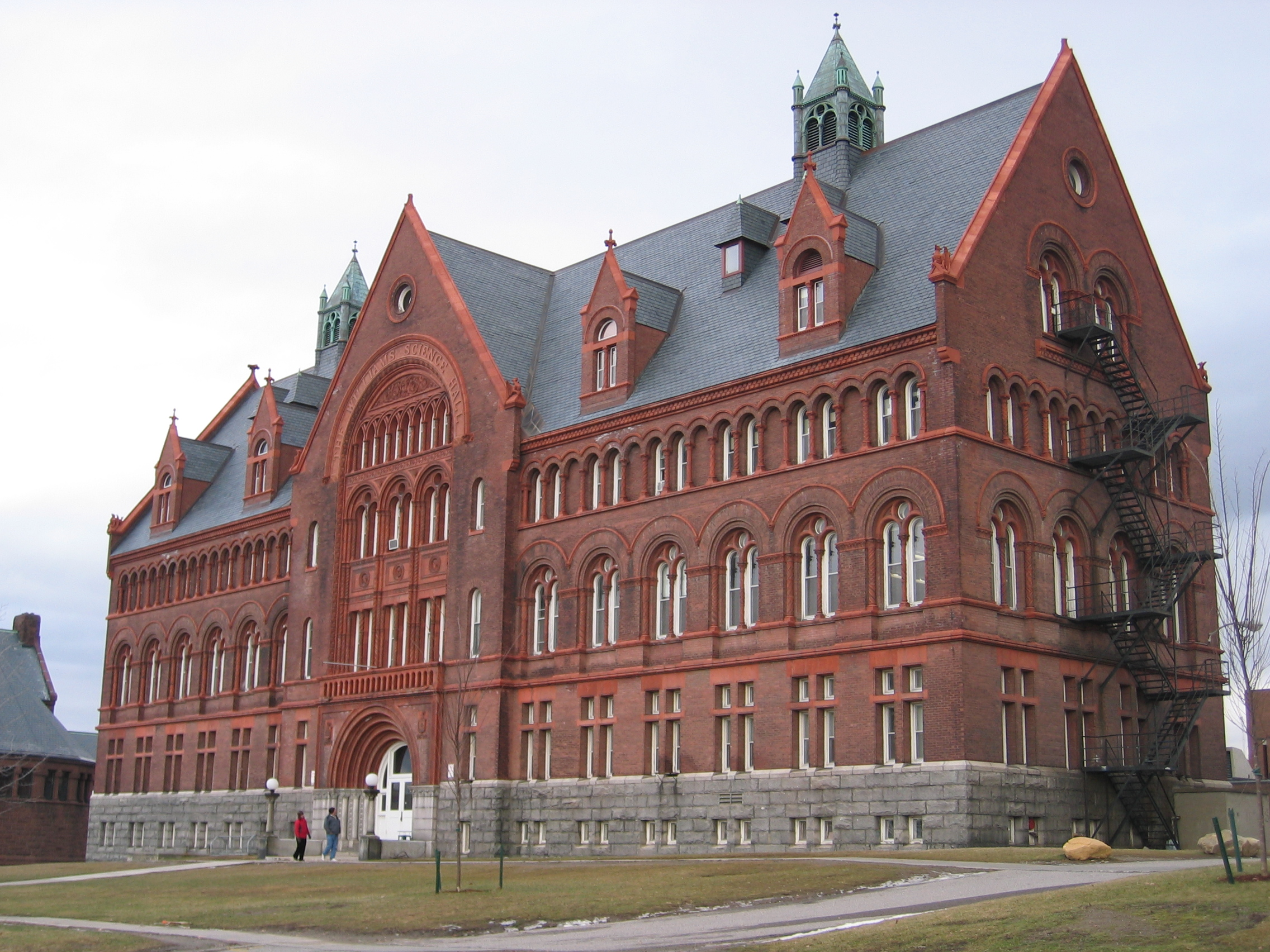
Williams Science Hall, University of Vermont, Burlington, VT (1894–96).

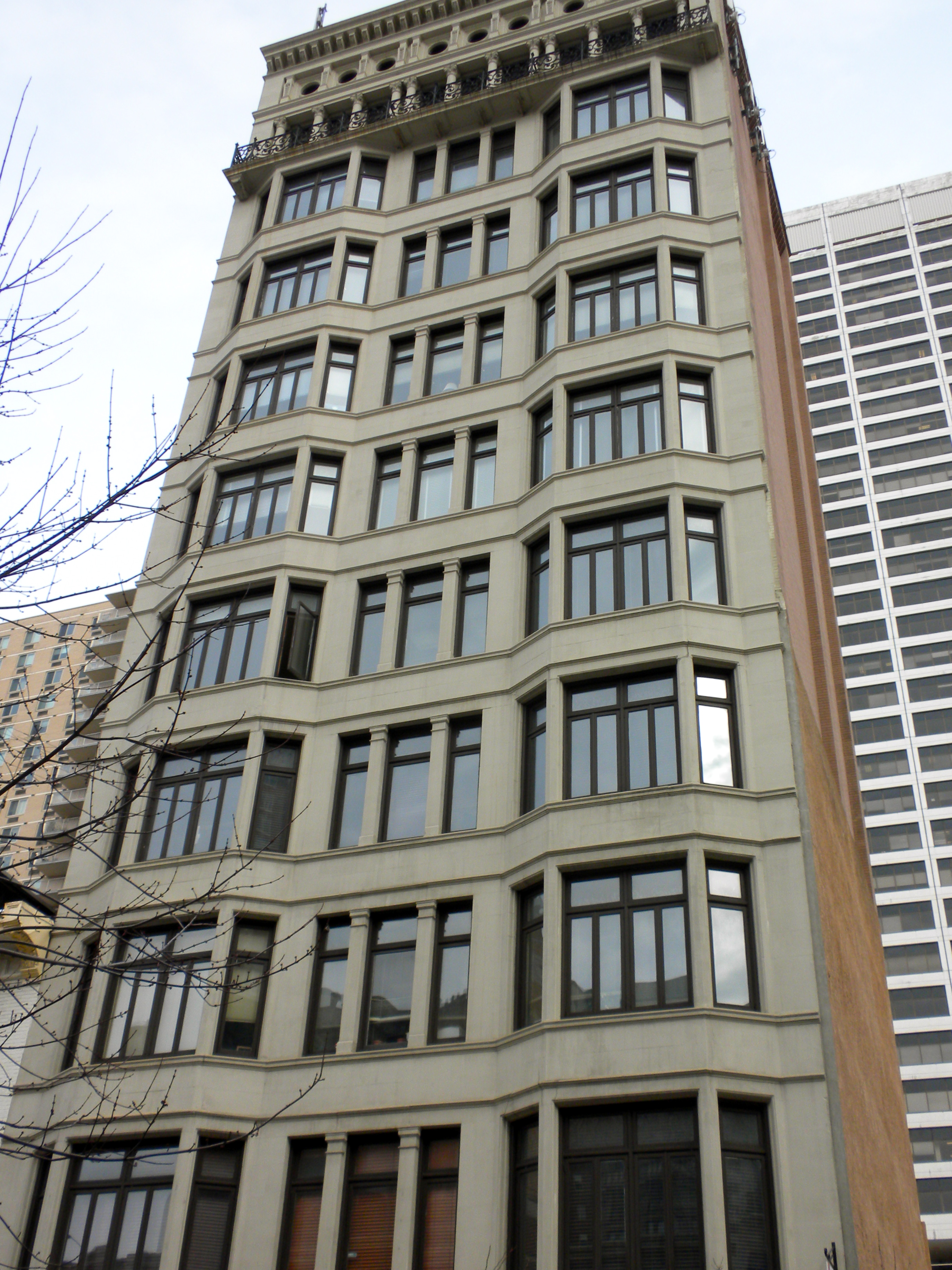
Physicians & Dentists Office Building, Philadelphia, PA (1896).

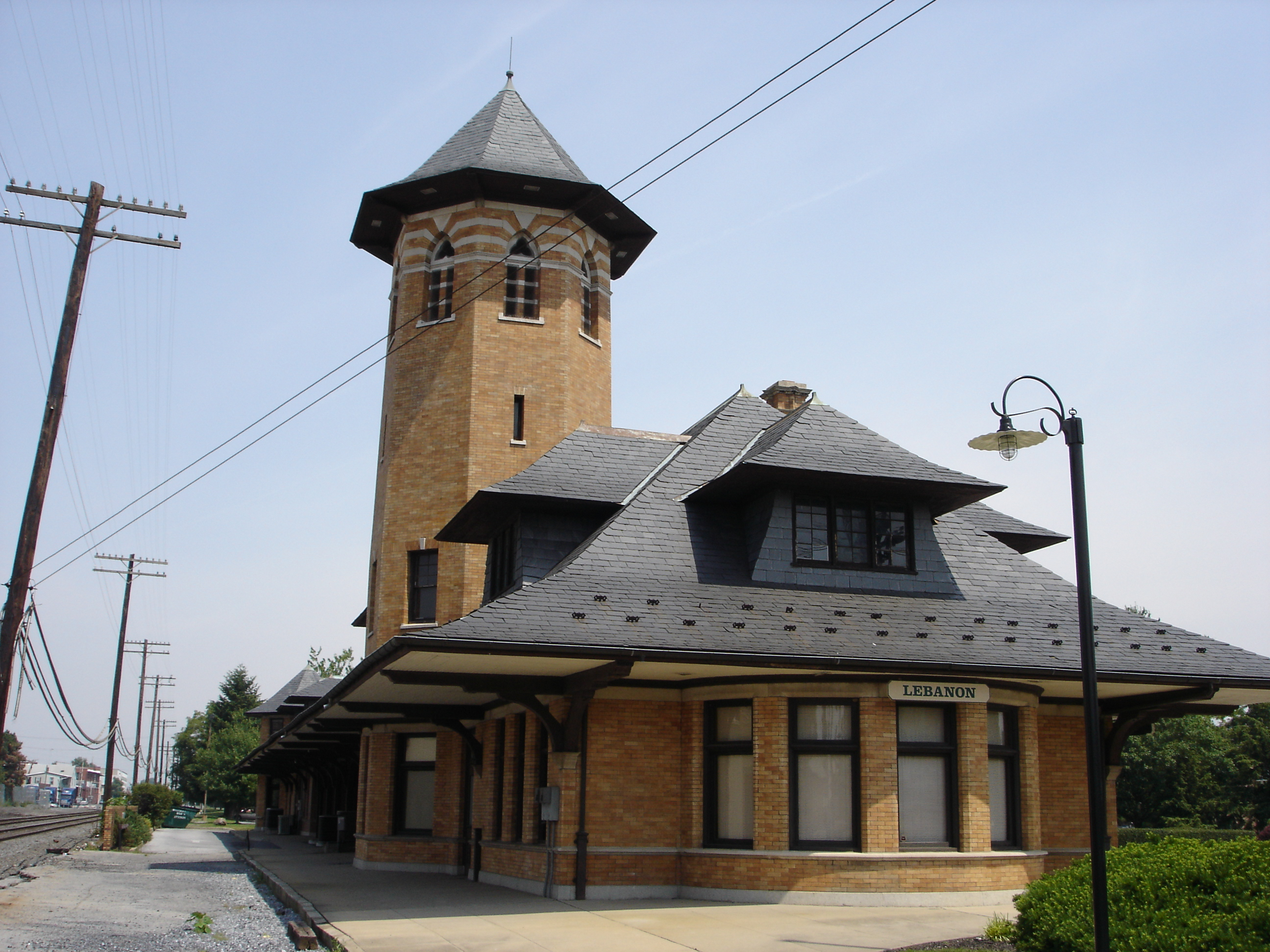
Reading Railroad Station, Lebanon, Pennsylvania (1900)
