= Dr. Edward H. Williams House =

Historic house in New Jersey, United States

- U.S. National Register of Historic Places
- U.S. Historic district – Contributing property
- New Jersey Register of Historic Places
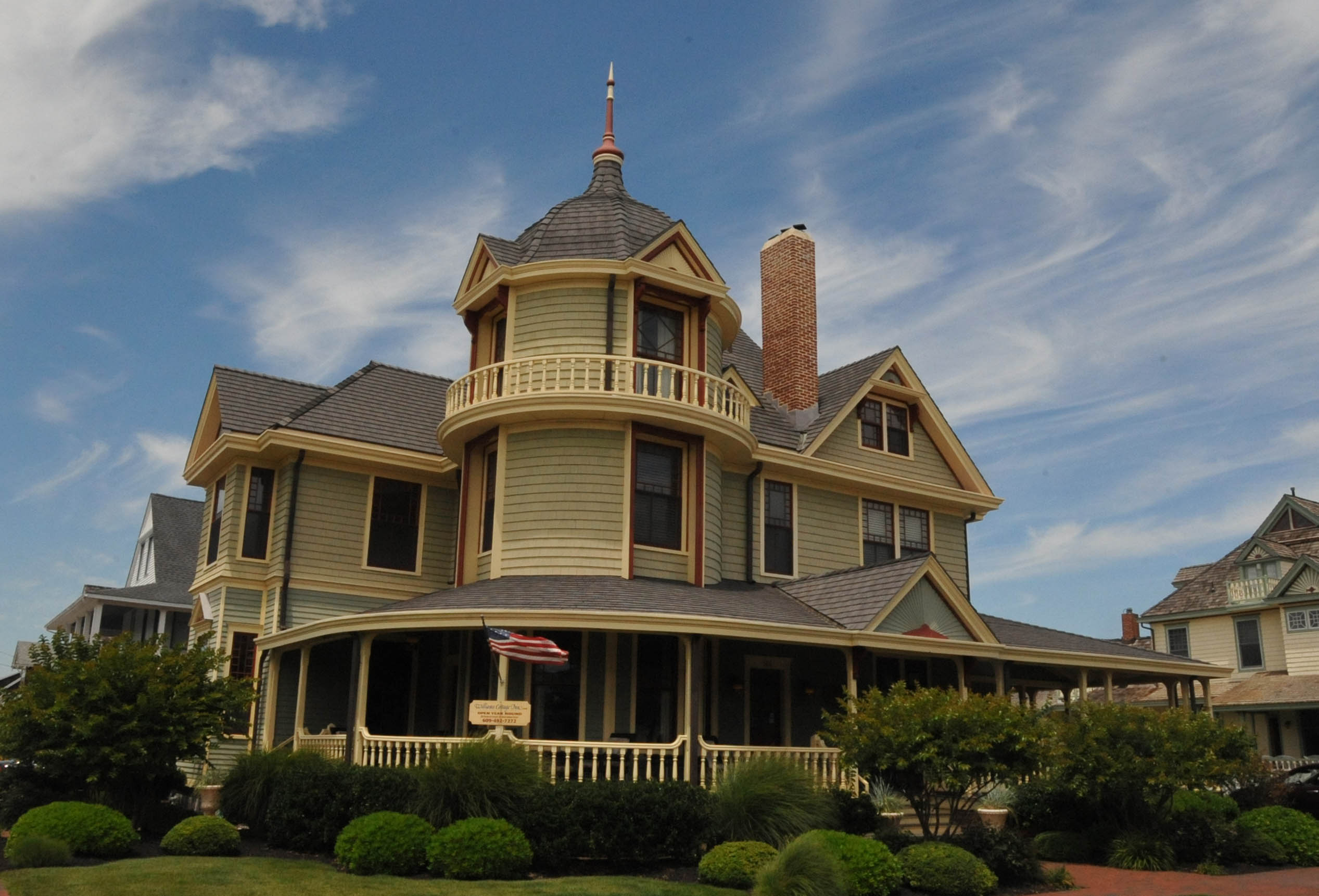

- Location within Ocean County, New Jersey Location within New Jersey Location within the United States
- Location: 506 South Atlantic Avenue; Beach Haven, New Jersey
- Coordinates: 39°33′30″N 74°14′24″W
- Built: c. 1884
- Architect: Wilson Brothers & Company
- Architectural style: Queen Anne
- Part of: Beach Haven Historic District (ID83001608)
- MPS: Beach Haven MRA
- NRHP reference No.: 83001612
- NJRHP No.: 2275

Significant dates
- Added to NRHP: July 14, 1983
- Designated CP: July 14, 1983
- Designated NJRHP: April 20, 1983

The Dr. Edward H. Williams House at 506 South Atlantic Avenue in Beach Haven, Ocean County, New Jersey is a Queen Anne-style summer house built c. 1884. It was designed by Wilson Brothers & Company for Edward H. Williams, a partner in the Baldwin Locomotive Works, and is a mirror image of the Converse Cottage next door. It was added to the National Register of Historic Places on July 14, 1983, for its significance in architecture. It was listed as part of the Beach Haven Multiple Resource Area (MRA). It is also a contributing property of the Beach Haven Historic District.

== See also ==
- National Register of Historic Places listings in Ocean County, New Jersey
