= Beach Haven Historic District =

Historic district in New Jersey, United States

- U.S. National Register of Historic Places
- U.S. Historic district
- New Jersey Register of Historic Places
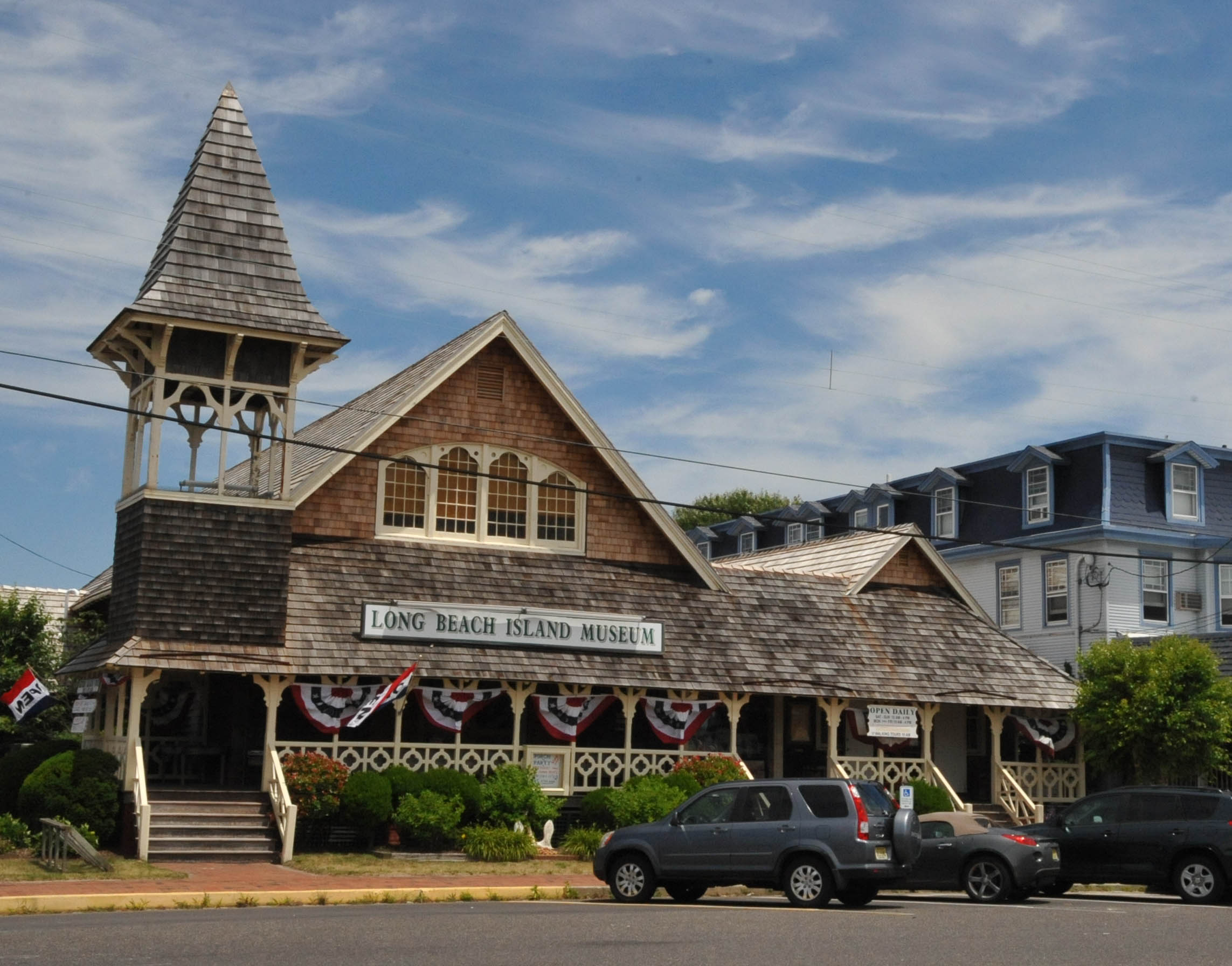
- Former Holy Innocents Mission Church, now Long Beach Island Museum

- Location within Ocean County, New Jersey Location within New Jersey Location within the United States
- Location: Roughly bounded by Bay and Atlantic Avenues, Pearl and 3rd Streets; Later by Atlantic, Bay, 5th and Chatsworth; Beach Haven, New Jersey
- Coordinates: 39°33′32″N 74°14′31″W
- Area: 23 acres (9.3 ha)
- Architect: Wilson Brothers & Company
- Architectural style: Gothic, Queen Anne, Shingle Style
- MPS: Beach Haven MRA
- NRHP reference No.: 83001608 (original); 14000933 (increase)
- NJRHP No.: 2272, 5373 (increase)

Significant dates
- Added to NRHP: July 14, 1983
- Boundary increase: November 19, 2014
- Designated NJRHP: April 20, 1983

The Beach Haven Historic District is a historic district in Beach Haven, Ocean County, New Jersey. The district was added to the National Register of Historic Places on July 14, 1983 for its significance in architecture and history as a beach-front resort during the 19th century. The district boundary was increased on November 19, 2014. It now includes 149 contributing buildings.

== Gallery of contributing properties ==
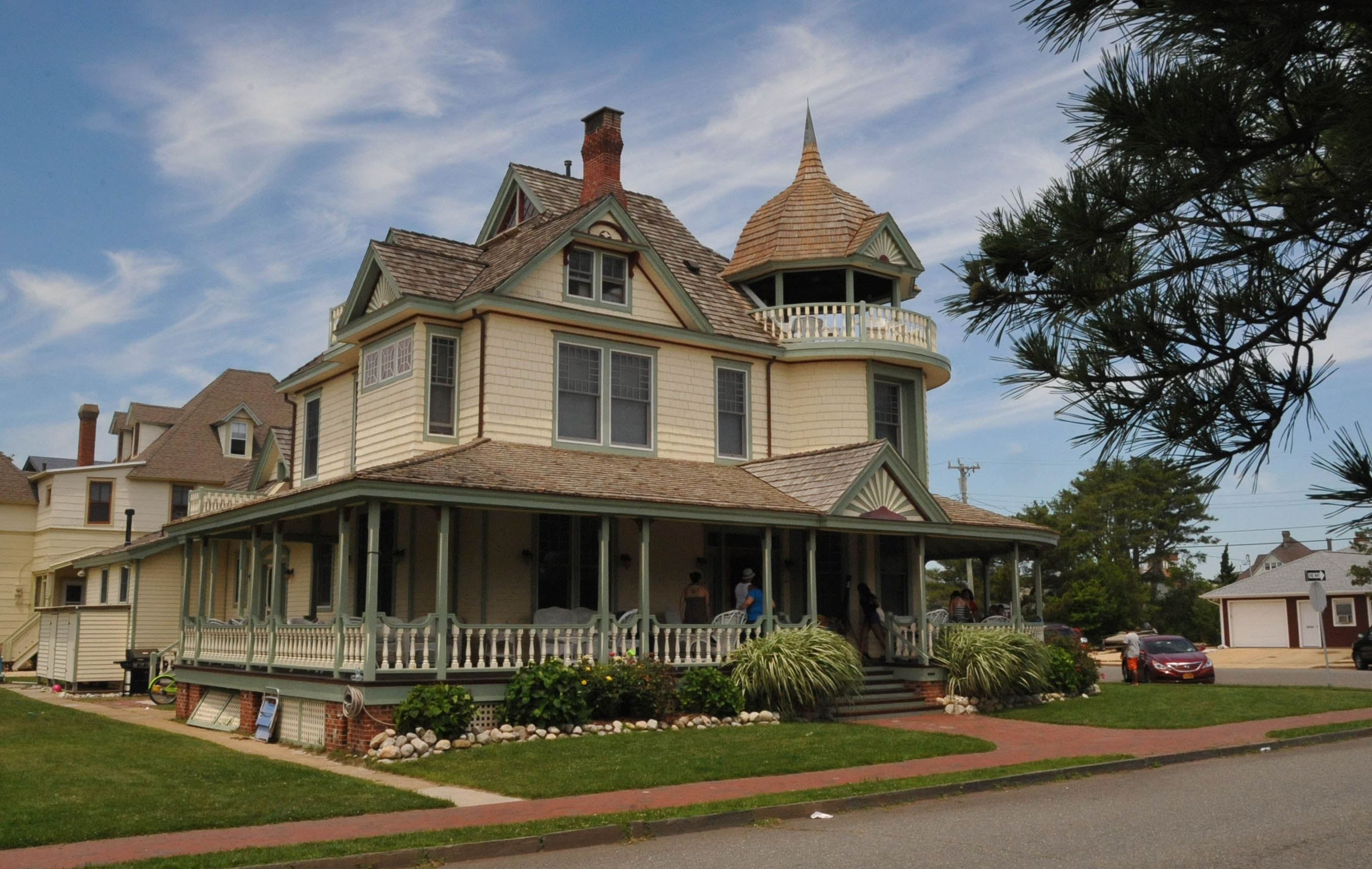
Converse Cottage

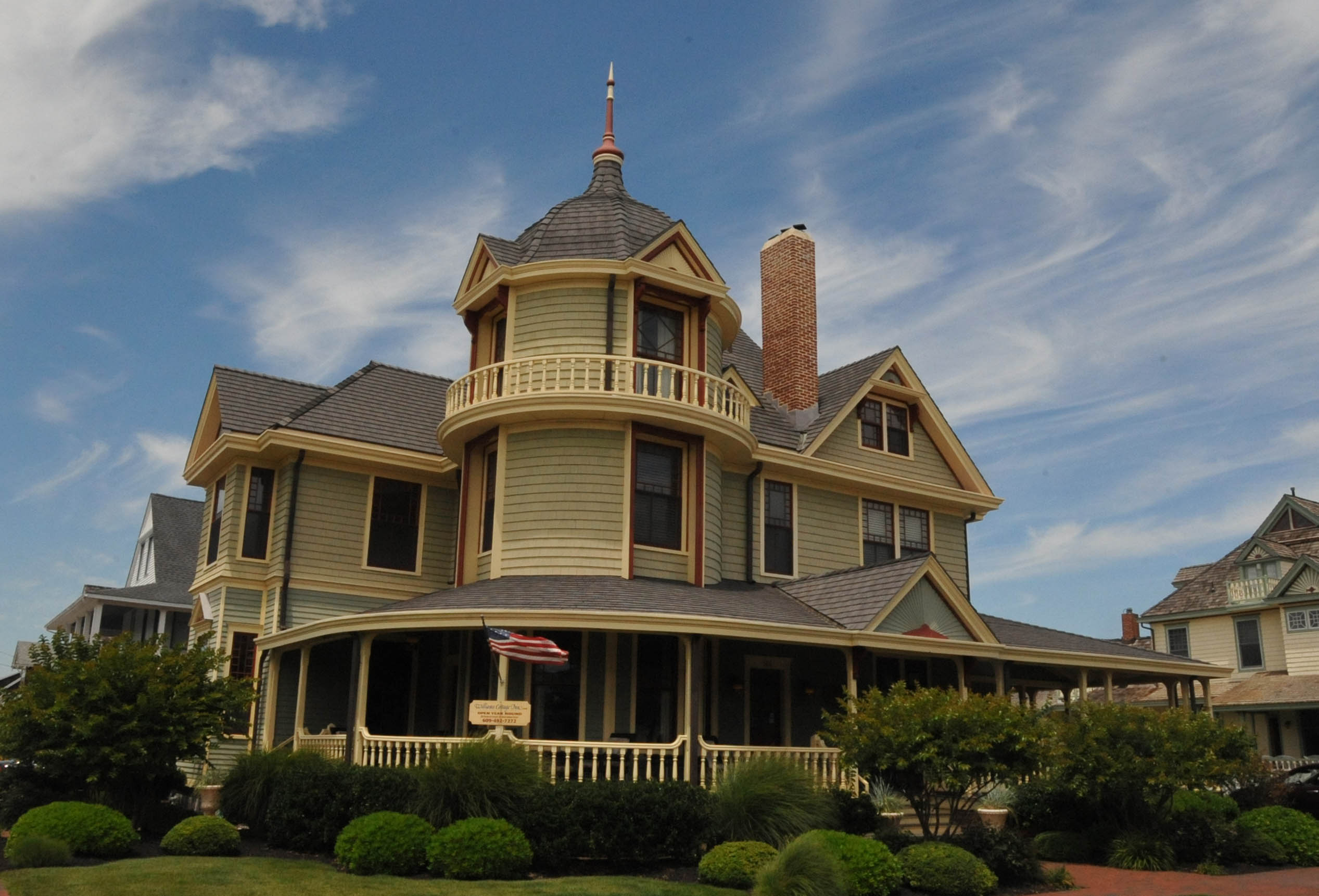
Dr. Edward H. Williams House

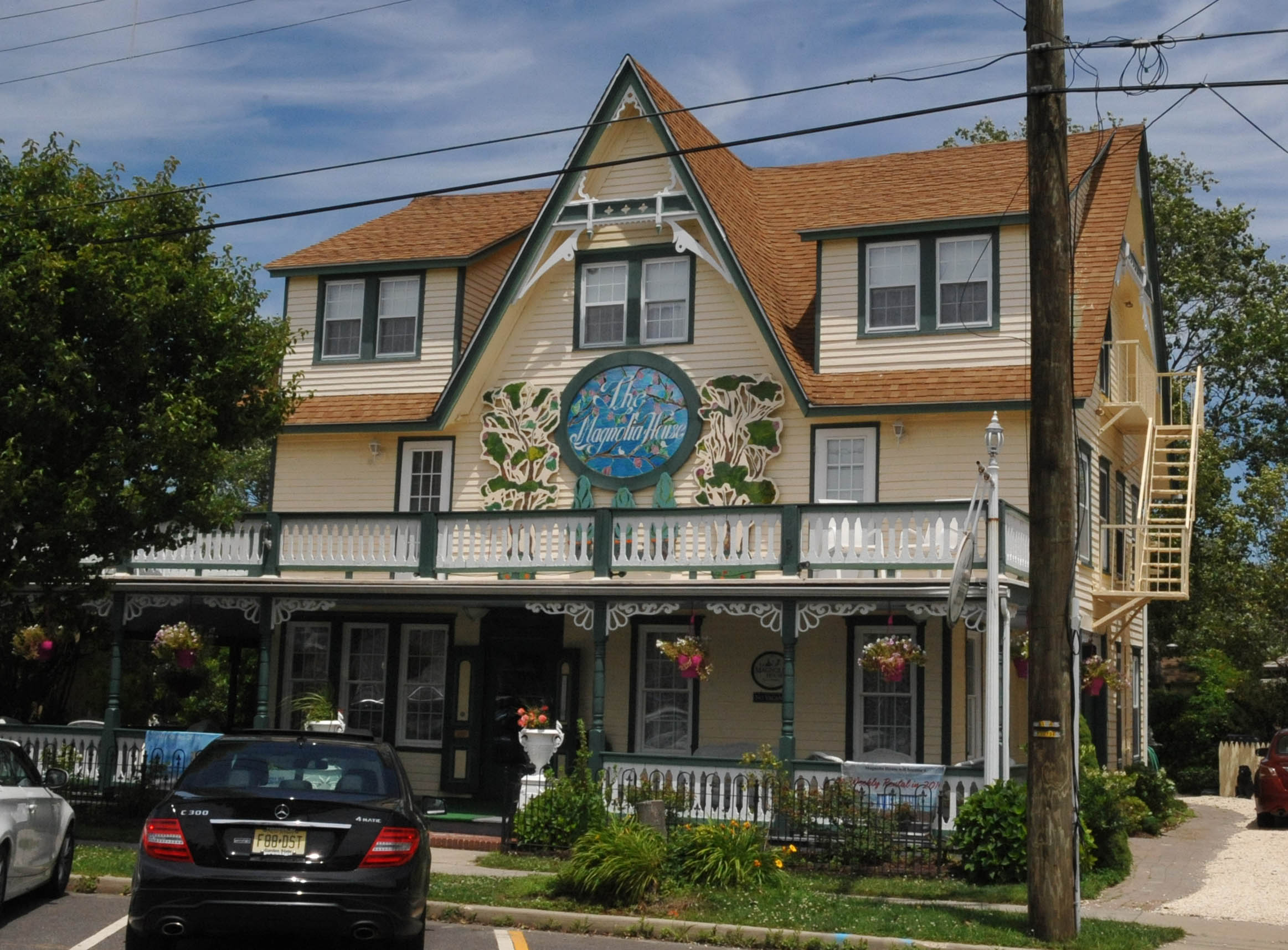
Magnolia House

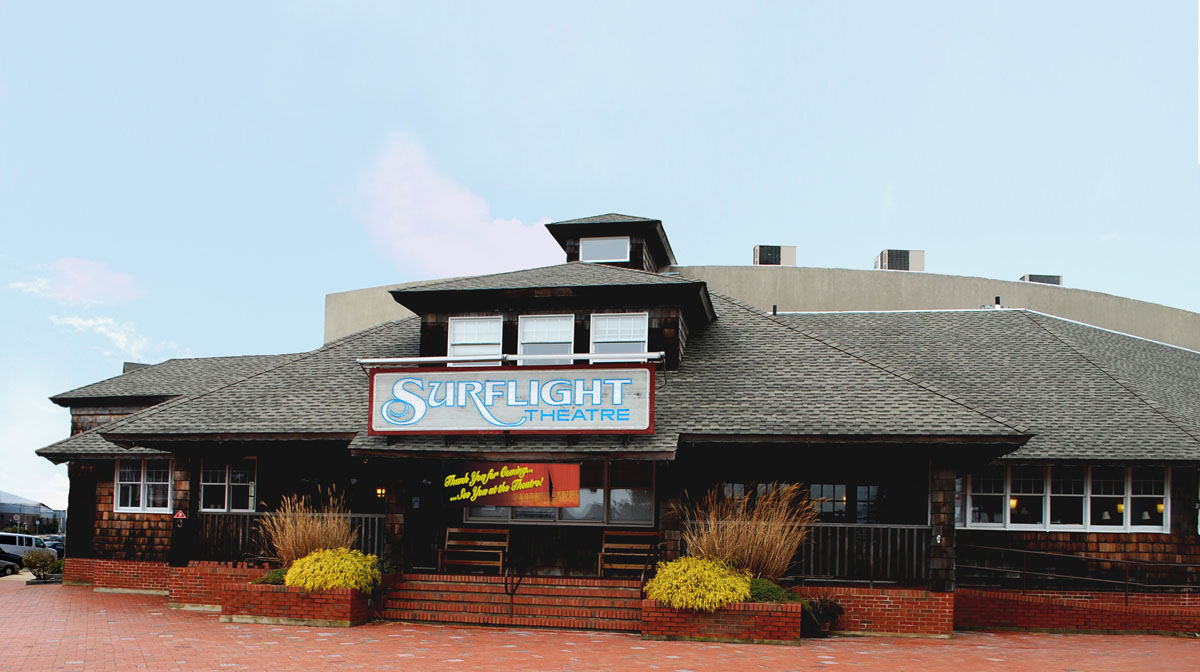
Surflight Theatre
