= Surflight Theatre =

- U.S. Historic district – Contributing property
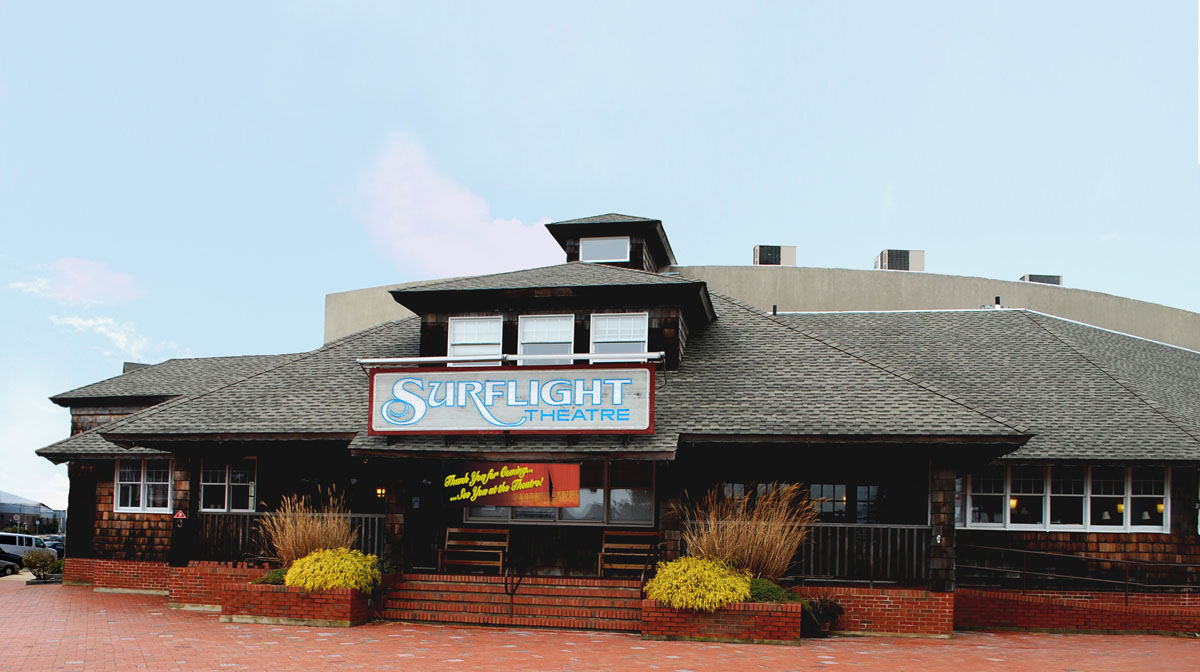
- Location: 200 Centre Street; Beach Haven, New Jersey
- Part of: Beach Haven Historic District (ID83001608)
- Designated CP: July 14, 1983

The Surflight Theatre, is a beach-side theatre located in the community of Beach Haven, New Jersey, on Long Beach Island on the Jersey Shore.

Surflight produces up to nine mainstage theatrical productions per season, children's theatre, a comedy and concert series, Surflight-To-Go Touring Educational Theatre and The Show Place Ice Cream Parlour.

After being closed in 2015 the Surflight Theatre reopened in June 2017 under the ownership of Al Parinello whose offer for purchase was accepted by TD Bank in early 2017. It currently successfully operates seasonally. With the COVID-19 pandemic it continues to operate in full compliance with CDC and State of NJ guidelines. The summer 2020 season operated with great acclaim in a tent across the street from the theatre.

It was added to the National Register of Historic Places on July 14, 1983 as a contributing property of the Beach Haven Historic District.

== History ==
In 1950, Surflight Theatre was founded by Joseph P. Hayes in Beach Haven Crest, on Long Beach Island. At first the performances were held in a 2,200-seat tent with a cast of 60 and a season that lasted three weeks. Surflight theatre transitioned through many locations. At the end of the 1960s a permanent facility was built on Engleside Avenue in Beach Haven, New Jersey.

The Show Place Ice Cream Parlour opened in 1975 by Hayes, in partnership with banker Scott Henderson, in a former bakery next to the theatre. This facility sold ice cream and presented a cabaret show. In 1976 Hayes died and was succeeded by Eleanor Miller. When Hayes died suddenly in 1976 Michael Curry, a college student, took over day-to-day management. He created the still existing roles of "Singing Manager", and the singing waiters, waitresses, dishwashers and ice cream scoopers, who created a series of unique songs and comedy skits, added to by generations of singing staff.

In 1987, the current theatre was constructed with 450 seats at the cost of $1.9 million. That same year the theatre reached an agreement with Actors Equity Association. Eleanor Miller retired in 1990 succeeded by Guil Fisher who became the artistic director with Scott Henderson as producer. Both were later replaced by Eddie Todd who was followed by Steve Steiner (a former intern and Broadway performer) from 1998 to 2010.

Early in the millennium, Surflight transitioned into a not-for-profit corporation as the Joseph P. Hayes Theatre, Inc. who in turn purchased the theatre, Show Place Ice Cream Parlor and all associated buildings.

Surflight Theatre went on to become a full member of the New Jersey Theatre Alliance as well as a member of the South Jersey Cultural Alliance. Then in 2003, the theatre was presented with the Governor’s Tourism Arts Award.

In 2010, Roy Miller (a former intern and Broadway producer) and colleague Tim Laczynski were contracted to run the theatre. The board of directors chose to file for bankruptcy protection in order to reorganize the financial foundation of the institution.

In 2011, a partnership with the Catch a Rising Star Comedy Club was formed to book the Comedy and Concert Series. In December, the theatre successfully emerged from Chapter 11 bankruptcy. In mid-summer of 2012 Miller and his business partner withdrew from the operation to pursue their producing efforts on Broadway.

Theatre veteran, Ken Myers returned to the theatre as executive director.

The theatre was flooded and sustained $750,000 in damages from Hurricane Sandy, but recovered and opened for the 2013 summer season. In 2015, however, it filed for Chapter 7 bankruptcy, and with rising costs and decreasing donation, the theater was closed.

On March 6, 2017 it was announced that the Surflight would open on June 23, 2017 under the new ownership of New Jersey native Al Parinello. Mr. Parinello is a real estate investor, Broadway and Movie Producer and is the current lead Producer for The Fantasticks in New York.

== Education ==
Surflight-to-Go (STG) is a touring professional theatre troupe which performs productions for schools and organizations. STG provides workshops and theatrical clinics, and an educational packet that includes a study guide, classroom activities and discussion topics.

Classes and workshops are held during the summer season with a program entitled S.T.A.R.S. (Surflight Theatre Arts Resource Schools). Apprenticeships are also available.

== Affiliations ==
- Society of Stage Directors and Choreographers: American Federation of Musicians
- International Ticketing Association
- Association of Performing Arts Presenters
- New Jersey Theatre Alliance
- Young Audiences NJ and Eastern PA
