= Lara Knutson =

American Artist and Industrial Designer

Lara Knutson (born 1974) is an American Artist and Industrial Designer. based in New York.

A native of Beach Haven, New Jersey, Knutson became interested in light reflecting off seashells and the water. She has a degree in architecture and a master's degree in industrial design from Pratt Institute She uses reflective glass materials in most of her work, focused on the various light effects when light hits these materials. Knutson was among the Artists featured in the exhibit "40 Under 40: Craft Futures" at the Renwick Gallery of the Smithsonian Museum of American Art, and one of her pieces was acquired by the museum. She also has a piece in the permanent collection of the Corning Museum of Glass. Her jewelry has been featured on the cover of the Museum of Modern Art's design store catalog.
