= Beach Haven, New Jersey =

Borough in Ocean County, New Jersey, US

- Borough
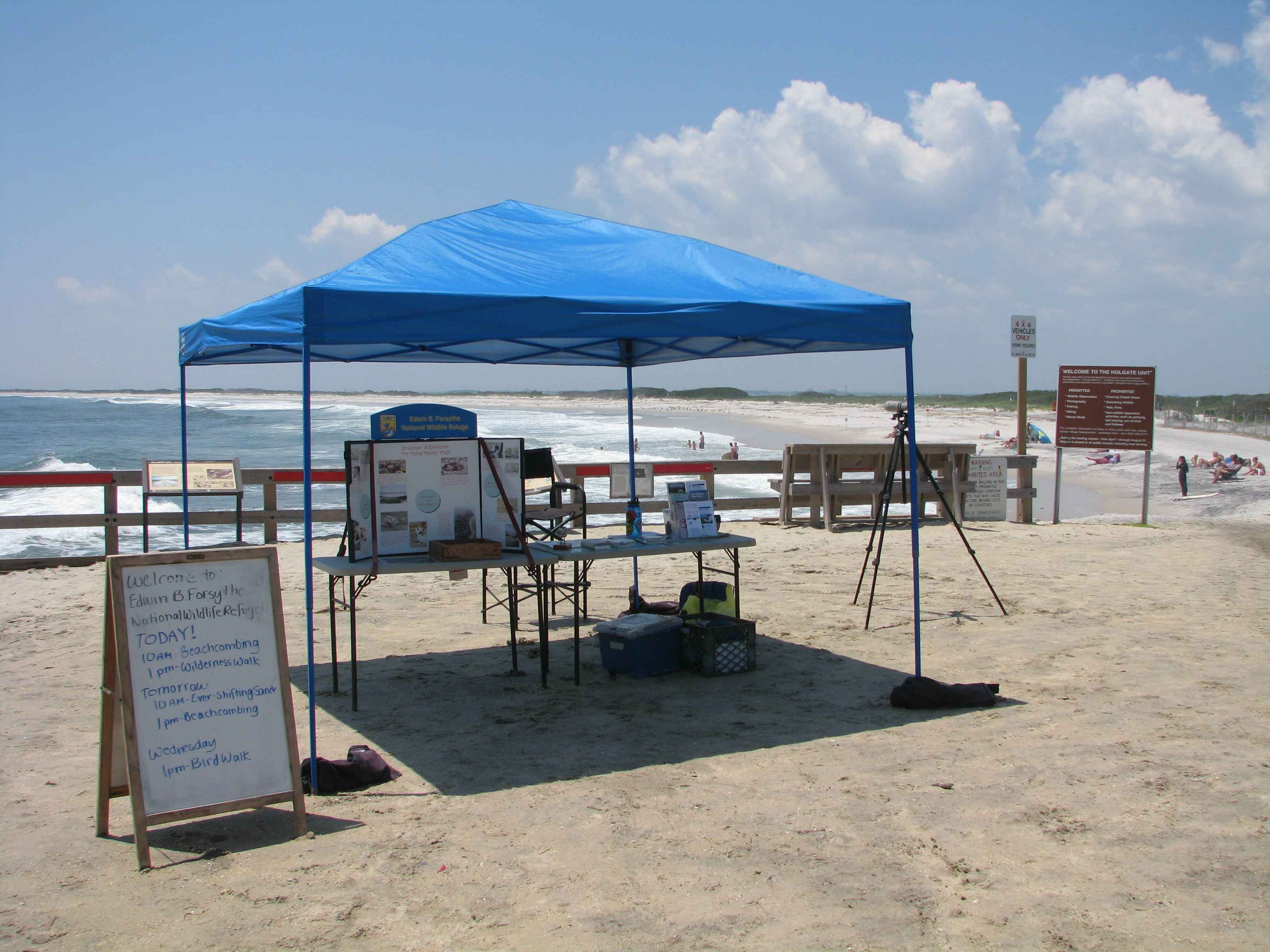
- The interpretative learning center of the Edwin B. Forsythe National Wildlife Refuge on the sand at Beach Haven, facing the Atlantic Ocean

- Seal
- Nickname: The Queen City
- Location of Beach Haven in Ocean County highlighted in red (right). Inset map: Location of Ocean County in New Jersey highlighted in orange (left).

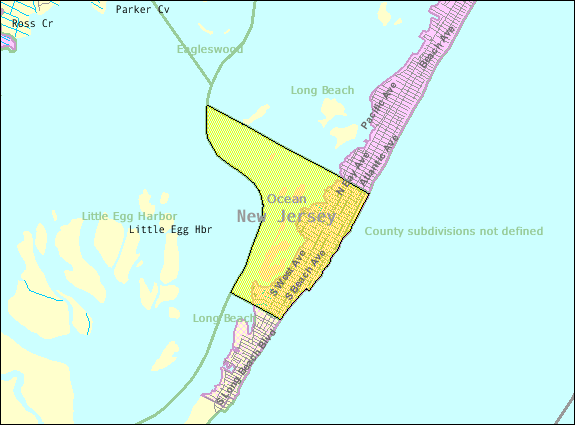
- Census Bureau map of Beach Haven, New Jersey

- Location in Ocean County Location in New Jersey Location in the United States
- Coordinates: 39.576031°N 74.251791°W
- Country: United States
- State: New Jersey
- County: Ocean
- Incorporated: November 11, 1890

Government
  - Type: Faulkner Act (council–manager)
  - Body: Borough Council
  - Mayor: Colleen Lambert (term ends December 31, 2028)
  - Manager: Sherry Mason
  - Municipal clerk: Sherry Mason

Area
  - Total: 2.33 sq mi (6.03 km^{2})
  - Land: 0.98 sq mi (2.54 km^{2})
  - Water: 1.35 sq mi (3.50 km^{2}) 57.94%
  - Rank: 386th of 565 in state 18th of 33 in county
- Elevation: 0 ft (0 m)

Population (2020)
  - Total: 1,027
  - Estimate (2023): 1,069
  - Rank: 529th of 565 in state 29th of 33 in county
  - Density: 1,048.6/sq mi (404.9/km^{2})
  - Rank: 377th of 565 in state 19th of 33 in county
- Time zone: UTC−05:00 (Eastern (EST))
  - Summer (DST): UTC−04:00 (Eastern (EDT))
- ZIP Code: 08008
- Area codes: 609 exchanges: 207, 361, 492, 494
- FIPS code: 3402903940
- GNIS feature ID: 885152
- Website: www.beachhaven-nj.gov

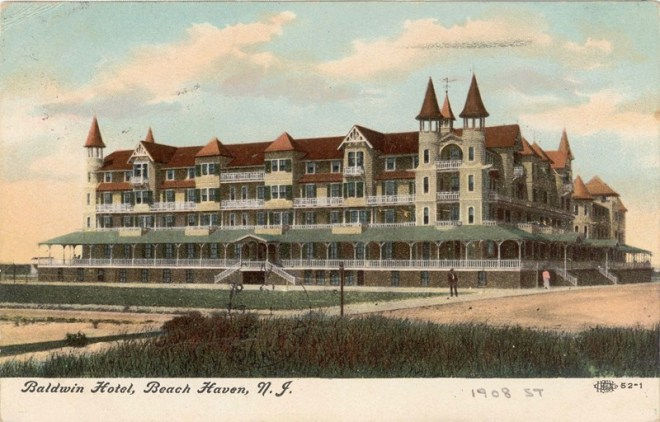
The historic Baldwin Hotel, circa 1908. The hotel was razed in 1960 and replaced by Veterans Memorial Park.

Beach Haven is a borough situated on the Jersey Shore in southern Ocean County, in the U.S. state of New Jersey. The borough is located on Long Beach Island (LBI) and borders the Atlantic Ocean. As of the 2020 United States census, the borough's population was 1,027, a decrease of 143 (−12.2%) from the 2010 census count of 1,170, which in turn reflected a decline of 108 (−8.5%) from the 1,278 counted in the 2000 census.

Beach Haven was incorporated as a Borough by an act of the New Jersey Legislature on November 11, 1890, from portions of Eagleswood Township, based on the results of a referendum held five days earlier.

== History ==
Beach Haven, known as the "Queen City," is a late 19th-century beachfront resort originally established in 1873 to house wealthy summer residents from Philadelphia. Although some of the major structures, including several hotels and a boardwalk, were lost to storms in the 1940s including the Great Atlantic Hurricane of 1944, a large portion of the town retains its Victorian and Edwardian character. The Beach Haven Historic District listed in the New Jersey and the National Register of Historic Places in the early 1980s, encompasses the most intact buildings at the core of the resort.

The first incident in the Jersey Shore shark attacks of 1916 took place at the east end of Engleside Avenue. The ensuing series of attacks along the Jersey Shore became the basis for the book Jaws, by Peter Benchley.

== Geography ==
According to the United States Census Bureau, the borough had a total area of 2.33 square miles (6.03 km^{2}), including 0.98 square miles (2.54 km^{2}) of land and 1.35 square miles (3.50 km^{2}) of water (57.94%).

The borough borders the Ocean County municipalities of Little Egg Harbor Township and Long Beach Township.

== Demographics ==
Historical population
Census	Pop.	Note	%±
1900	239		—
1910	272		13.8%
1920	329		21.0%
1930	715		117.3%
1940	746		4.3%
1950	1,050		40.8%
1960	1,041		−0.9%
1970	1,488		42.9%
1980	1,714		15.2%
1990	1,475		−13.9%
2000	1,278		−13.4%
2010	1,170		−8.5%
2020	1,027		−12.2%
2023 (est.)	1,069	▲	4.1%
Population sources: 1900–2000; 1900–1920 1900–1910; 1910–1930 1940–2000; 2000 2010 2020

=== 2010 census ===
The 2010 United States census counted 1,170 people, 531 households, and 301 families in the borough. The population density was 1,196.0 per square mile (461.8/km^{2}). There were 2,667 housing units at an average density of 2,726.2 per square mile (1,052.6/km^{2}). The racial makeup was 92.65% (1,084) White, 0.34% (4) Black or African American, 0.00% (0) Native American, 0.77% (9) Asian, 0.00% (0) Pacific Islander, 5.90% (69) from other races, and 0.34% (4) from two or more races. Hispanic or Latino of any race were 9.91% (116) of the population.

Of the 531 households, 15.4% had children under the age of 18; 43.5% were married couples living together; 9.6% had a female householder with no husband present and 43.3% were non-families. Of all households, 36.7% were made up of individuals and 17.9% had someone living alone who was 65 years of age or older. The average household size was 2.20 and the average family size was 2.81.

13.8% of the population were under the age of 18, 6.9% from 18 to 24, 19.7% from 25 to 44, 34.5% from 45 to 64, and 25.0% who were 65 years of age or older. The median age was 51.5 years. For every 100 females, the population had 90.2 males. For every 100 females ages 18 and older there were 93.7 males.

The Census Bureau's 2006–2010 American Community Survey showed that (in 2010 inflation-adjusted dollars) median household income was $71,532 (with a margin of error of +/− $4,910) and the median family income was $89,306 (+/− $12,115). Males had a median income of $54,750 (+/− $63,730) versus $51,875 (+/− $34,023) for females. The per capita income for the borough was $52,498 (+/− $9,292). About 3.8% of families and 5.8% of the population were below the poverty line, including 18.3% of those under age 18 and 1.2% of those age 65 or over.

=== 2000 census ===
As of the 2000 United States census there were 1,278 people, 586 households, and 346 families residing in the borough. The population density was 1,301.8 inhabitants per square mile (502.6/km^{2}). There were 2,555 housing units at an average density of 2,602.6 per square mile (1,004.9/km^{2}). The racial makeup of the borough was 98.83% White, 0.08% African American, 0.55% Asian, 0.08% from other races, and 0.47% from two or more races. Hispanic or Latino of any race were 4.69% of the population.

There were 586 households, out of which 18.3% had children under the age of 18 living with them, 47.4% were married couples living together, 8.7% had a female householder with no husband present, and 40.8% were non-families. 35.0% of all households were made up of individuals, and 19.5% had someone living alone who was 65 years of age or older. The average household size was 2.17 and the average family size was 2.80.

In the borough, the population was spread out, with 17.1% under the age of 18, 5.1% from 18 to 24, 22.0% from 25 to 44, 28.1% from 45 to 64, and 27.7% who were 65 years of age or older. The median age was 49 years. For every 100 females, there were 87.1 males. For every 100 females age 18 and over, there were 86.4 males.

The median income for a household in the borough was $48,355, and the median income for a family was $68,036. Males had a median income of $39,444 versus $29,688 for females. The per capita income for the borough was $30,267. About 1.2% of families and 3.7% of the population were below the poverty line, including 3.3% of those under age 18 and 1.9% of those age 65 or over.

== Arts and culture ==
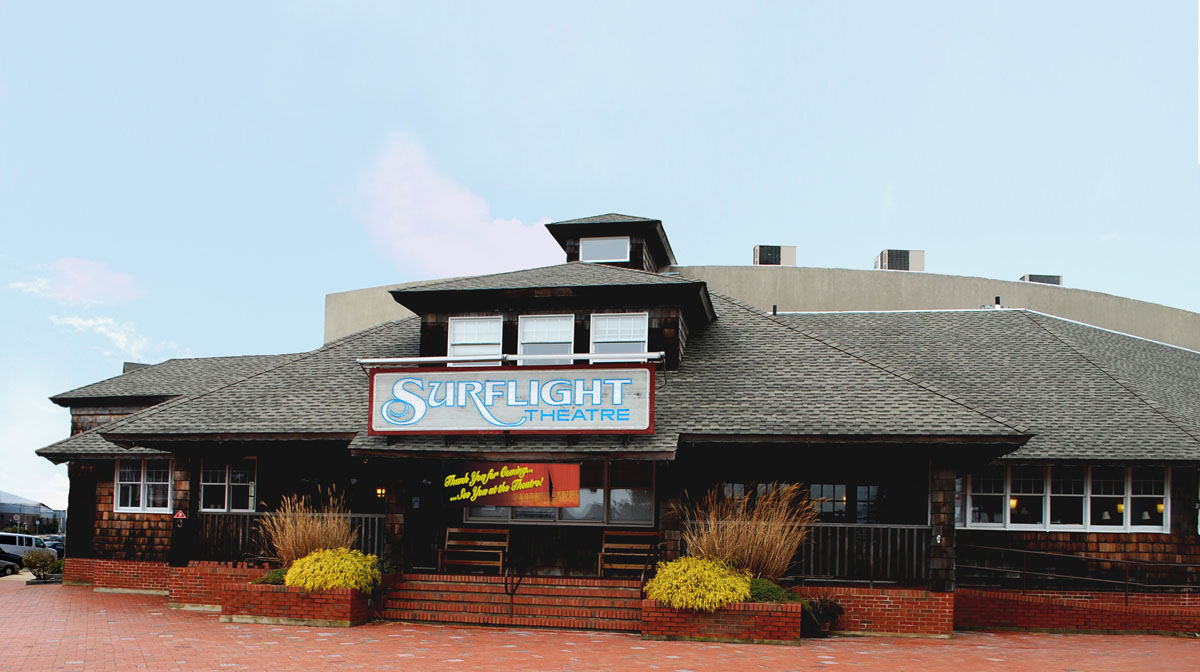
The Surflight Theatre

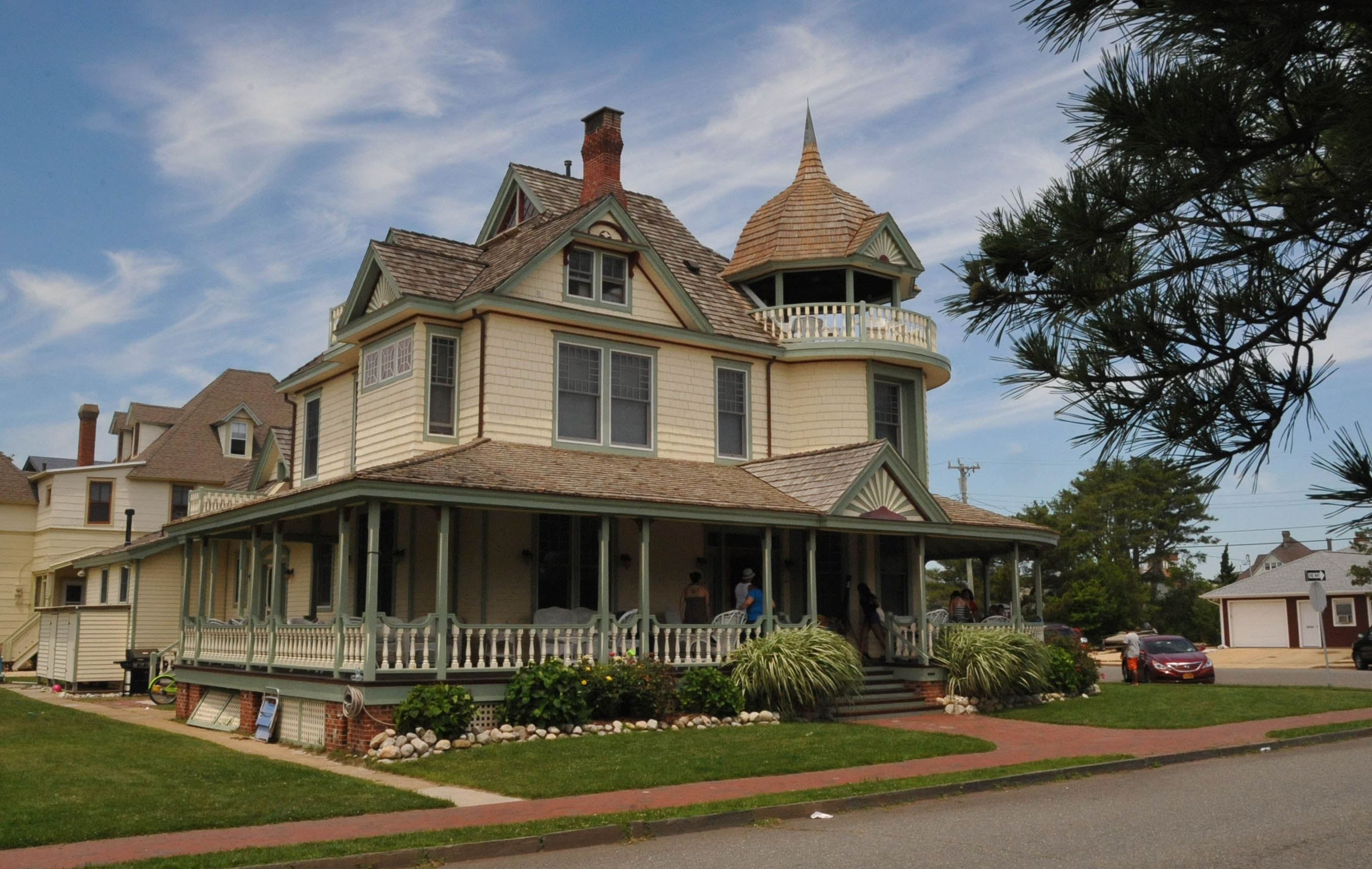
Converse Cottage in the Beach Haven Historic District

The Surflight Theatre is a 450-seat theater originally established in 1950 that offers theatrical productions for adults and children. It and its sister establishment, the cabaret-style sing-for-your dessert restaurant the Showplace Ice Cream Parlour, closed in 2015 after filing for bankruptcy with $2.6 million in debt, re-opening in 2017 under new ownership.

The New Jersey Maritime Museum is a Beach Haven establishment dedicated to the maritime history of the Jersey Shore with a focus on shipwrecks in the region. It is run by Deborah Whitcraft, who previously served on the Long Beach city council and formerly ran a diving company.

The Long Beach Island Historical Museum is in Beach Haven, and displays artifacts related to the history of Long Beach Island in general.

== Parks and recreation ==
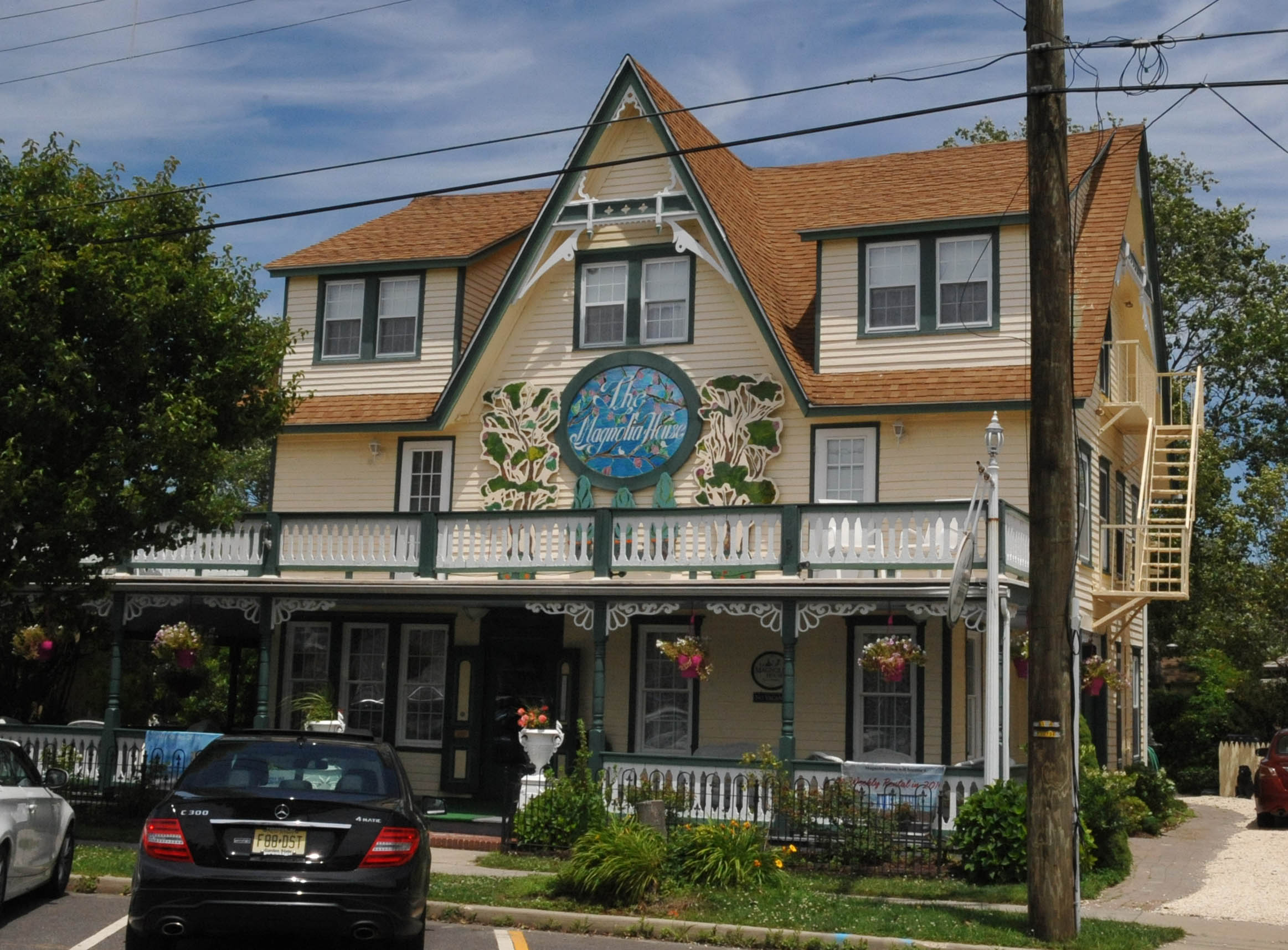
Magnolia House in the Beach Haven Historic District

Veteran's Bicentennial Park, in the heart of Beach Haven, hosts many concerts, flea markets, and food and art festivals in the summer months. Like Nelson Avenue Park, Taylor Park, and Walsh Field, these areas provide open parks for general recreation and host frequent events during the summer months. Beach Haven’s parks also offer a mixture of public sporting facilities including those for tennis, pickleball, baseball, soccer, and basketball.

As the island is only a few blocks wide, the beach and the bay (Little Egg Harbor) are readily accessible from anywhere in Beach Haven. Pavilions could be found at Fifth and Pearl Streets, both of which were washed away by Hurricane Sandy in October 2012 and subsequently rebuilt in June 2013. Beach volleyball facilities have also been erected adjacent to the Fifth Street pavilion and on Second Street.

Beach badges are required to access the beach during guarded hours from Memorial Day to Labor Day, and can be purchased at Borough Hall or the office at the Beach Patrol Headquarters on Centre Street, however daily and weekly badges may be purchased via mobile app. Beach badges are not required for access on Wednesdays.

Beach Haven is home to multiple attractions, including the only amusement park on the island, Fantasy Island, and the only waterpark on the island, Thundering Surf. Both of these highlights are located on the north end of the municipality nearby Historic Bay Village and Schooners Wharf shopping districts.

Beach haven also has numerous miniature golf courses including Adventure Golf, adjacent to Thundering Surf Waterpark, and Mr. Tee's Family Arcade & Mini Golf.

== Government ==
=== Local government ===
Since 2010, Beach Haven has operated within the Faulkner Act, formally known as the Optional Municipal Charter Law, under the Council-Manager form of government. The township is one of 42 municipalities (of the 564) statewide that use this form of government. The governing body is comprised of five members, who are elected on an at-large basis in staggered non-partisan elections, with either two or three seats up for vote in even-numbered years as part of the November general election in a four-year cycle. At a reorganization meeting held each January, one member is chosen as mayor and another as council president, each serving one-year terms in that position. Beach Haven had previously been governed under the Walsh Act, by a three-member Board of Commissioners, one of whom was selected to serve as Mayor, under a system in place from 1946 to 2010.

As of 2024, members of the Beach Haven Borough Council are Mayor Nancy Taggart Davis (2024), Council President Catherine "Kitty" Snyder (2026), Jaime Baumiller (2026), Colleen Lambert (2024) and Michael K. McCaffrey (2024; elected to serve an unexpired term).

In the November 2014 general election incumbent James White, who had not placed his name on the ballot for re-election, won the second open council seat behind a write-in campaign that brought him 167 votes, ahead of Don Katskis, who had received a total of 165 votes.

=== Federal, state and county representation ===
Beach Haven is located in the 2nd Congressional District and is part of New Jersey's 9th state legislative district. Prior to the 2010 Census, Beach Haven had been part of the 3rd Congressional District, a change made by the New Jersey Redistricting Commission that took effect in January 2013, based on the results of the November 2012 general elections.

For the 119th United States Congress, New Jersey's 2nd congressional district is represented by Jeff Van Drew (R, Dennis Township). New Jersey is represented in the United States Senate by Democrats Cory Booker (Newark, term ends 2027) and Andy Kim (Moorestown, term ends 2031).

For the 2026–2027 session, the 9th legislative district of the New Jersey Legislature is represented in the State Senate by Carmen Amato (R, Berkeley Township) and in the General Assembly by Greg Myhre (R, Stafford Township) and Brian E. Rumpf (R, Little Egg Harbor Township).

Ocean County is governed by a Board of County Commissioners composed of five members who are elected on an at-large basis in partisan elections and serving staggered three-year terms of office, with either one or two seats coming up for election each year as part of the November general election. At an annual reorganization held in the beginning of January, the board chooses a director and a deputy director from among its members. As of 2025, Ocean County's Commissioners (with party affiliation, term-end year and residence) are:

John P. Kelly (R, 2025, Eagleswood Township), Virginia E. Haines (R, 2025, Toms River), Robert Arace (R, Manchester Township, 2027) Jennifer Bacchione (R, Berkeley Township, 2027) and Frank Sadeghi (R, 2026, Toms River).

Constitutional officers elected on a countywide basis are: Clerk Scott M. Colabella (R, 2025, Barnegat Light), Sheriff Michael G. Mastronardy (R, 2025; Toms River) and Surrogate Jeffrey Moran (R, 2028, Beachwood).

=== Politics ===
Presidential election results

United States presidential election results for Beach Haven
Year	Republican		Democratic		Third party(ies)	
Year	No.	%	No.	%	No.	%
2024	418	53.52%	353	45.20%	10	1.28%
2020	422	51.72%	373	45.71%	21	2.57%
2016	392	56.48%	273	39.34%	29	4.18%
2012	339	61.75%	206	37.52%	4	0.73%
2008	435	58.00%	308	41.07%	7	0.93%
2004	505	63.28%	291	36.47%	2	0.25%
2000	472	67.05%	206	29.26%	26	3.69%
1996	431	64.91%	176	26.51%	57	8.58%
1992	492	65.25%	145	19.23%	117	15.52%
1988	567	79.97%	129	18.19%	13	1.83%
1984	734	74.82%	235	23.96%	12	1.22%
1980	656	65.14%	245	24.33%	106	10.53%
1976	548	62.77%	325	37.23%	0	0.00%
1972	609	77.38%	178	22.62%	0	0.00%
1968	461	64.21%	178	24.79%	79	11.00%
1964	384	55.73%	305	44.27%	0	0.00%
1960	488	73.94%	172	26.06%	0	0.00%
1956	508	81.28%	117	18.72%	0	0.00%
1952	479	77.76%	137	22.24%	0	0.00%
1948	390	75.73%	125	24.27%	0	0.00%
1944	271	63.92%	153	36.08%	0	0.00%
1940	340	65.64%	178	34.36%	0	0.00%
1936	287	57.52%	212	42.48%	0	0.00%
1932	274	59.31%	188	40.69%	0	0.00%
1924	225	83.03%	46	16.97%	0	0.00%
1920	151	84.36%	28	15.64%	0	0.00%
1916	91	78.45%	25	21.55%	0	0.00%
1912	17	15.60%	35	32.11%	57	52.29%

Beach Haven has supported all Republican presidential candidates since at least 1916. As of March 2011, there were a total of 992 registered voters in Beach Haven, of which 175 (17.6%) were registered as Democrats, 346 (34.9%) were registered as Republicans and 471 (47.5%) were registered as Unaffiliated. There were no voters registered to other parties. Among the borough's 2010 Census population, 84.8% (vs. 63.2% in Ocean County) were registered to vote, including 98.3% of those ages 18 and over (vs. 82.6% countywide).

Gubernatorial election results for Beach Haven
Year	Republican		Democratic		Third party(ies)	
Year	No.	%	No.	%	No.	%
2025	356	57.51%	262	42.33%	1	0.16%
2021	339	62.55%	200	36.90%	3	0.55%
2017	224	53.59%	185	44.26%	9	2.15%
2013	366	77.87%	98	20.85%	6	1.28%
2009	333	61.33%	163	30.02%	47	8.66%
2005	284	60.43%	177	37.66%	9	1.91%

In the 2013 gubernatorial election, Republican Chris Christie received 77.9% of the vote (366 cast), ahead of Democrat Barbara Buono with 20.9% (98 votes), and other candidates with 1.3% (6 votes), among the 483 ballots cast by the borough's 967 registered voters (13 ballots were spoiled), for a turnout of 49.9%. In the 2009 gubernatorial election, Republican Chris Christie received 59.8% of the vote (333 ballots cast), ahead of Democrat Jon Corzine with 29.3% (163 votes), Independent Chris Daggett with 7.5% (42 votes) and other candidates with 0.9% (5 votes), among the 557 ballots cast by the borough's 1,033 registered voters, yielding a 53.9% turnout.

United States Senate election results for Beach Haven1
Year	Republican		Democratic		Third party(ies)	
Year	No.	%	No.	%	No.	%
2024	415	55.70%	325	43.62%	5	0.67%
2018	332	60.04%	198	35.80%	23	4.16%
2012	325	61.44%	197	37.24%	7	1.32%
2006	313	61.74%	186	36.69%	8	1.58%

United States Senate election results for Beach Haven2
Year	Republican		Democratic		Third party(ies)	
Year	No.	%	No.	%	No.	%
2020	444	55.92%	337	42.44%	13	1.64%
2014	279	63.27%	156	35.37%	6	1.36%
2013	179	64.16%	96	34.41%	4	1.43%
2008	401	57.95%	283	40.90%	8	1.16%

== Education ==
The Beach Haven School District serves public school students in pre-kindergarten through sixth grade at Beach Haven Elementary School. As of the 2022–23 school year, the district, comprised of one school, had an enrollment of 73 students and 11.0 classroom teachers (on an FTE basis), for a student–teacher ratio of 6.6:1. In the 2016–17 school year, Beach Haven had the 3rd-smallest enrollment of any school district in the state, with 70 students.

For seventh through twelfth grades, public school students attend the Southern Regional School District, which serves the five municipalities in the Long Beach Island Consolidated School District (Barnegat Light, Harvey Cedars, Long Beach Township, Ship Bottom and Surf City), along with students from Beach Haven and Stafford Township, as well as the sending district of Ocean Township. Schools in the district (with 2022–23 enrollment data from the National Center for Education Statistics) are Southern Regional Middle School with 905 students in grades 7–8 and Southern Regional High School with 1,845 students in grades 9–12. Both schools are in the Manahawkin section of Stafford Township.

== Transportation ==
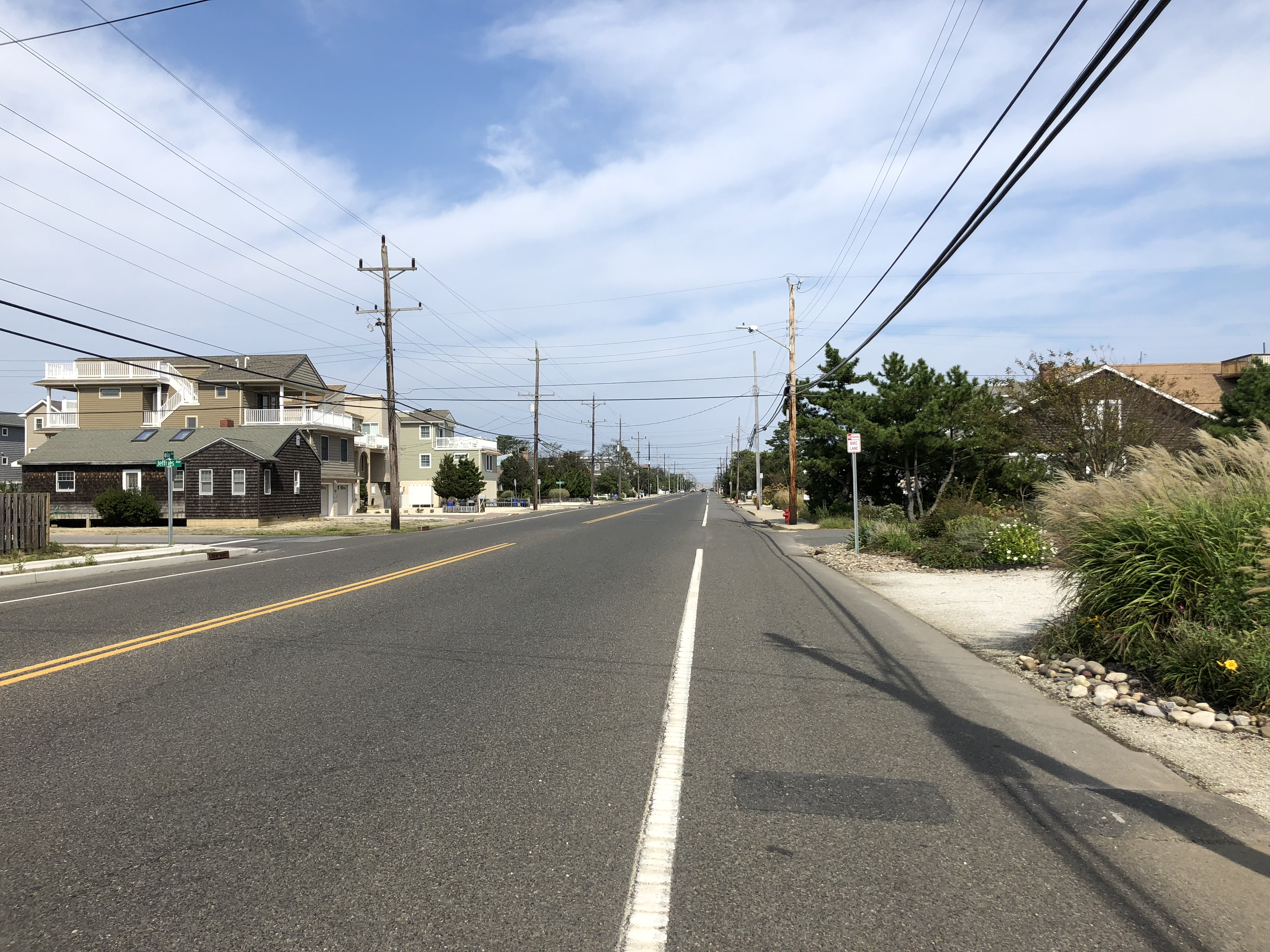
County Route 607 (Bay Avenue) northbound in Beach Haven

=== Roads and highways ===
As of May 2010, the borough had a total of 20.93 miles (33.68 km) of roadways, of which 17.56 miles (28.26 km) were maintained by the municipality and 3.37 miles (5.42 km) by Ocean County.

No Interstate, U.S. or state highways serve Beach Haven. The main road serving the borough is County Route 607 (Bay Avenue).

=== Public transportation ===
Ocean Ride provides bus service on the OC9 LBI South route between Holgate and Manahawkin / Stafford Township.

The LBI Shuttle operates along Long Beach Boulevard, providing free service every 5 to 20 minutes from 10:00 AM to 10:00 PM. It serves the Long Beach Island municipalities / communities of Barnegat Light, Loveladies, Harvey Cedars, North Beach, Surf City, Ship Bottom, Long Beach Township, Beach Haven and Holgate.

== Climate ==
According to the Köppen climate classification system, Beach Haven has a Humid subtropical climate (Cfa).

Climate data for Beach Haven (39.5594, -74.2430), Elevation 7 ft (2 m), 1991–2020 normals, extremes 1981–2022
Month	Jan	Feb	Mar	Apr	May	Jun	Jul	Aug	Sep	Oct	Nov	Dec	Year
Record high °F (°C)	69.4 (20.8)	74.5 (23.6)	85.7 (29.8)	89.0 (31.7)	93.2 (34.0)	97.8 (36.6)	100.6 (38.1)	99.4 (37.4)	96.1 (35.6)	90.1 (32.3)	81.3 (27.4)	72.6 (22.6)	100.6 (38.1)
Mean daily maximum °F (°C)	41.5 (5.3)	42.9 (6.1)	48.5 (9.2)	58.2 (14.6)	67.7 (19.8)	77.2 (25.1)	82.7 (28.2)	81.5 (27.5)	75.9 (24.4)	65.5 (18.6)	55.1 (12.8)	46.5 (8.1)	62.0 (16.7)
Mean daily minimum °F (°C)	27.1 (−2.7)	28.4 (−2.0)	34.6 (1.4)	43.9 (6.6)	53.6 (12.0)	63.3 (17.4)	69.1 (20.6)	68.3 (20.2)	62.1 (16.7)	50.2 (10.1)	39.9 (4.4)	32.4 (0.2)	47.8 (8.8)
Record low °F (°C)	−4.6 (−20.3)	2.1 (−16.6)	8.0 (−13.3)	19.0 (−7.2)	35.8 (2.1)	45.4 (7.4)	51.1 (10.6)	46.1 (7.8)	41.2 (5.1)	29.6 (−1.3)	18.6 (−7.4)	0.3 (−17.6)	−4.6 (−20.3)
Average precipitation inches (mm)	3.34 (85)	3.24 (82)	4.11 (104)	3.10 (79)	3.07 (78)	3.38 (86)	4.01 (102)	4.37 (111)	3.42 (87)	3.94 (100)	3.05 (77)	4.23 (107)	43.27 (1,099)
Average snowfall inches (cm)	6.2 (16)	5.0 (13)	2.5 (6.4)	0.0 (0.0)	0.0 (0.0)	0.0 (0.0)	0.0 (0.0)	0.0 (0.0)	0.0 (0.0)	0.0 (0.0)	0.1 (0.25)	3.5 (8.9)	17.2 (44)
Average dew point °F (°C)	24.3 (−4.3)	25.2 (−3.8)	30.3 (−0.9)	39.7 (4.3)	50.6 (10.3)	61.3 (16.3)	66.5 (19.2)	65.9 (18.8)	60.2 (15.7)	48.6 (9.2)	37.7 (3.2)	30.1 (−1.1)	45.1 (7.3)
Source 1: PRISM
Source 2: NOHRSC (Snow, 2008/2009 - 2022/2023 normals)

Climate data for Atlantic City, NJ Ocean Water Temperature, 1911–present normals
Month	Jan	Feb	Mar	Apr	May	Jun	Jul	Aug	Sep	Oct	Nov	Dec	Year
Daily mean °F (°C)	39.7 (4.3)	38.5 (3.6)	41.9 (5.5)	48.7 (9.3)	56.4 (13.6)	64.7 (18.2)	68.9 (20.5)	73.1 (22.8)	72.2 (22.3)	64.1 (17.8)	53.6 (12.0)	45.2 (7.3)	55.7 (13.2)
Source: NCEI

== Ecology ==
According to the A. W. Kuchler U.S. potential natural vegetation types, Beach Haven would have a dominant vegetation type of Northern Cordgrass (73) with a dominant vegetation form of Coastal Prairie (20).

== Notable people ==
People who were born in, residents of, or otherwise closely associated with Beach Haven include:

- Doc Cramer (1905–1990), center fielder who played for four American League teams
- Elizabeth Warder Crozer Campbell (1893-1971), archaeologist
- Lara Knutson (born 1974), artist and industrial designer, who was influenced by being fascinated as a child by the play of light on seashells along the beachfront in her hometown, as well as the texture they would create when crushed
- Joe Piscopo (born 1951), comedian and actor
- Henry Wisniewski (1908–1988), American football player and dentist

Preceded by North Beach Haven	Beaches of New Jersey	Succeeded by Brigantine
