= List of museums in New Jersey =

This list of museums in New Jersey is a list of museums, defined for this context as institutions (including nonprofit organizations, government entities, and private businesses) that collect and care for objects of cultural, artistic, scientific, or historical interest and make their collections or related exhibits available for public viewing. Museums that exist only in cyberspace (i.e., virtual museums) are not included.

Lists of New Jersey institutions which are not museums are noted in the "See also" section, below.

== List ==
Name	Image	Location	County	Region	Area of study	Summary
Absecon Light		Atlantic City	Atlantic	South Jersey	Lighthouse	Lighthouse and local history museum
Acorn Hall		Morristown	Morris	Skylands Region	Historic house	Operated by the Morris County Historical Society, 1853 Victorian Italianate mansion with changing exhibits on local history
African American Heritage Museum of Southern New Jersey		Newtonville	Atlantic	South Jersey	African American	website, locations in Atlantic City and Newtonville, African American history, culture, art
African Art Museum of the SMA Fathers		Tenafly	Bergen	Gateway Region	Art	website, African art, operated by the Society of African Missions, changing exhibits of sub-Saharan sculpture and painting, costumes, textiles, decorative arts, religion and folklore
Afro-American Historical and Cultural Society Museum		Jersey City	Hudson	Gateway Region	African American	New Jersey African American history and African artifacts
AIDS Museum		Newark	Essex	Gateway Region	Medical	Planned museum
Air Victory Museum		Mount Laurel	Burlington	Delaware River Region	Aviation	website
A. J. Meerwald		Commercial Township	Cumberland	South Jersey	Museum ship	Delaware Bay oyster dredgeboat built in 1928
Allaire Village		Wall	Monmouth	Shore Region	Living	Encompasses the Howell Iron Works Company, an industrial center in the 1830s, as well as a working blacksmith shop, carpenter shop, general store, bakery, church, enameling building, carriage house, row houses, and other homes
Allen House		Shrewsbury	Monmouth	Shore Region	Historic house	Operated by the Monmouth County Historical Association Museum, 1710 tavern house
American Hungarian Museum		Passaic	Passaic	Gateway Region	Ethnic	website, also known as Hungarian Folklore Museum, decorated eggs, lace, pottery, traditional clothing
American Indian Heritage Museum		Westampton Township	Burlington	Delaware River Region	Native American	website, American Indian history and culture, operated by the Powhatan Renape Nation
American Labor Museum		Haledon	Passaic	Gateway Region	History	Victorian house with period rooms, labor exhibits, labor and immigrant library; historic meeting site for silk mill workers
Army Reserve Mobilization Museum		Fort Dix	Burlington	Delaware River Region	Military	website, also known as Fort Dix Military Museum, history of U.S. Army Reserve, open to the public by appointment
Atlantic City Art Center		Atlantic City	Atlantic	South Jersey	Art	website
Atlantic City Historical Museum		Atlantic City	Atlantic	South Jersey	Local history	website, presented by the Atlantic City Free Public Library at the Garden Pier
Atlantic County Historical Society		Somers Point	Atlantic	South Jersey	Local history	website, household items and decorative arts, fine arts, weaponry, maritime artifacts and toys
Aviation Hall of Fame and Museum of New Jersey		Teterboro	Bergen	Gateway Region	Transportation - Aerospace	New Jersey's aviation and space heritage
Avalon History Center		Avalon	Cape May	South Jersey	Local history	website
Bainbridge House		Princeton	Mercer	Delaware River Region	Local history	website, headquarters and museum for the Historical Society of Princeton
Bayonne Community Museum		Bayonne	Hudson	Gateway Region	Local history	under development as facility is restored
Bayonne Fire Museum		Bayonne	Hudson	Gateway Region	Firefighting	
Barclay Farmstead Museum		Cherry Hill	Camden	Delaware River Region	Historic house	1816 furnished farmhouse on 32 acres (130,000 m^{2}) with trails, living history programs
Barnegat Historic Heritage Village		Barnegat Light	Ocean	Shore Region	Open air	website, operated by the Barnegat Historical Society, includes 4 buildings and 3 smaller structures; Lippincott-Faulkenburg House, the Barber Shop, the Edwards House, the Butcher Shop, a corn crib, a motel cabin and a three-hole necessary
Barnegat Light Historical Society Museum		Barnegat Light	Ocean	Shore Region	Local history	Located in 1903 schoolhouse, includes Edith Duff Gwinn Garden
Barnegat Lighthouse		Barnegat Light	Ocean	Shore Region	Lighthouse	Lighthouse and museum interpretive center
Barron Arts Center		Woodbridge	Middlesex	Gateway Region	Art	Art center website
Batsto Village		Washington Township	Burlington	South Jersey	Living	Includes Batsto mansion, a sawmill, a 19th-century ore boat, a charcoal kiln, ice and milk houses, a carriage house and stable, a blacksmith and wheelwright shop, a gristmill and a general store
Battleship New Jersey Museum and Memorial		Camden	Camden	Delaware River Region	Museum Ship	USS New Jersey (BB-62)
Bay Head Historical Society Museum		Bay Head	Ocean	Shore Region	Historic house	website, 19th-century period farmhouse
Beavertown History Center		Lincoln Park	Morris	Skylands Region	Local history	Operated by the Beaverton Historical Society
Belskie Museum of Art & Science		Closter	Bergen	Gateway Region	Art	website, works of sculptor Abram Belskie and 10 changing exhibitions each year
Benjamin Temple House		Ewing Township	Mercer	Delaware River Region	Historic house	website, 18th-century house, operated by the Ewing Township Historic Preservation Society
Bergen Museum of Art and Science		Hackensack	Bergen	Gateway Region	Multiple	Art and science, currently closed and seeking new location
Berkeley Historical Museum		Bayville	Ocean	Shore Region	Local history	
Blackwells Mills Canal House		Franklin Township	Somerset	Skylands Region	Transportation	19th-century bridge tender's house on the Delaware and Raritan Canal
Blairstown Museum		Blairstown	Warren	Kittatinny Valley	Local History	Artifact collections are used to interpret the area's history through permanent and changing exhibits and to educate the public about the area's history through programs, resource materials, and events.
Boonton Historical Society and Museum		Boonton	Morris	Skylands Region	Local history	Located in the Colonial Revival and Victorian Gothic styles house of Dr. John L. Taylor
Boxwood Hall		Elizabeth	Union	Gateway Region	Historic house	Home from 1772 to 1795 of Elias Boudinot, president of the Continental Congress
Brearley House		Lawrenceville	Mercer	Delaware River Region	Historic house	Operated by the Lawrenceville Historical Society, restored mid-18th-century house
Bedensville Schoolhouse		Montgomery	Somerset	Skylands Region	School	Operated by Van Harlingen Historical Society for education programs
Brick Academy		Basking Ridge	Somerset	Skylands Region	Local history	Operated by the Historical Society of the Somerset Hills
Bridgeton Hall of Fame All Sports Museum		Bridgeton	Cumberland	South Jersey	Hall of fame - sports	information
Brigantine History Museum		Brigantine	Atlantic	South Jersey	Local history	Operated by the Brigantine Historical Society
Buccleuch Mansion		New Brunswick	Middlesex	Gateway Region	Historic house	Operated by the Jersey Blue chapter of the Daughters of the American Revolution
Buckelew Mansion		Jamesburg	Middlesex	Gateway Region	Historic house	Operated by the Jamesburg Historical Association
Burlington County Historical Society		Burlington City	Burlington	Delaware River Region	Open air	website, complex including 3 historic houses: Bard-How House, James Fenimore Cooper House, and Captain James Lawrence House; Aline Wolcott Museum Galleries with exhibits of local history
Burlington County Prison Museum		Mount Holly	Burlington	Delaware River Region	Prison	Operated by Burlington County Parks and the Prison Museum Association
Butler Museum		Butler	Morris	Skylands Region	Local history	Located in an old railroad station
Caesar Hoskins Log Cabin		Mauricetown	Cumberland	South Jersey	Historic house	18th-century house, open by appointment
Caldwell Parsonage		Union	Union	Gateway Region	Local history	Operated by the Union Township Historical Society
Califon Historical Society Station Museum		Califon	Hunterdon	Skylands Region	Railroad	website, local history and railroad artifacts
Camden County Museum		Camden	Camden	Delaware River Region	Local history	website, operated by the Camden County Historical Society, includes 19th-century domestic, farm and workplace tools, one room schoolhouse, blacksmith shop, antique vehicles
Camden Shipyard and Maritime Museum		Camden	Camden	Delaware River Region	Maritime	website, local maritime history including boat and ship builders, boating, natural history of the Delaware River and area streams
Camp Olden Civil War Round Table and Museum		Hamilton	Mercer	Delaware River Region	History	website, Civil War and Native American exhibits
Cape May Lighthouse		Cape May Point	Cape May	South Jersey	Maritime	Located in Cape May Point State Park
Cape May Maritime Museum		Cape May	Cape May	South Jersey	Maritime	website, planned museum, Cape May County's maritime heritage
Carter House		Summit	Union	Gateway Region	Historic house	website, home of the Summit Historical Society, mid-18th-century house
Center for the Arts in Southern New Jersey		Marlton	Burlington	Delaware River Region	Art	website
Centennial Cottage		Ocean Grove	Monmouth	Shore Region	Historic house	website, operated by the Historical Society of Ocean Grove, late 19th-century period cottage used for Camp Meeting retreats
Charles S. Shultz House		Montclair	Essex	Gateway Region	Historic house	Operated by the Montclair Historical Society, 1896 home with synthesis of styles popular in the last quarter of the 19th century
Children's Museum of Somerset County		Bridgewater	Somerset	Skylands Region	Children's	website
Church of the Presidents		Long Branch	Monmouth	Shore Region	Historic church	Former Episcopal chapel on the Jersey Shore where seven United States presidents worshiped
Clarke House Museum		Princeton	Mercer	Delaware River Region	Historic house	Revolutionary period home located in Princeton Battlefield State Park
Clifton Arts Center		Clifton	Passaic	Gateway Region	Art	website, community art gallery and outdoor sculpture park
Collings-Knight House		Collingswood	Camden	Delaware River Region	Historic house	website, operated by the Friends of Collings-Knight House
Colonial House Museum		Cape May	Cape May	South Jersey	Historic house	website, 1775 tavern with colonial era cooking/eating room and bedroom, changing exhibits of local history, operated by the Greater Cape May Historical Society
Cooper Gristmill		Chester Township	Morris	Skylands Region	Mill	website, Operated by the Morris County Park Commission, restored 19th-century gristmill
Cornelius Low House		Piscataway	Middlesex	Gateway Region	Local history	Also known as Cornelius Low House / Middlesex County Museum, changing exhibits of state and local history
Country Living Museum		Hopewell Township	Cumberland	South Jersey	History	information, farm and shop tools, household equipment, glassware, kitchen utensils, World War II era memorabilia, restored antique clocks, sewing machines, typewriters; part of Dutch Neck Village, a collection of unique shops
Covenhoven House		Freehold Borough	Monmouth	Shore Region	Historic house	Operated by the Monmouth County Historical Association Museum, served as headquarters for British General Sir Henry Clinton before the Battle of Monmouth in 1778
Cranbury Museum		Cranbury	Middlesex	Gateway Region	Local history	website, operated by the Cranbury Historical and Preservation Society
Crane House and Museum		Montclair	Essex	Gateway Region	Historic house	Operated by the Montclair Historical Society, Federal mansion with 18th- and 19th-century furnishings
Crane-Phillips House		Cranford	Union	Gateway Region	Historic house	Operated by the Cranford Historical Society, 19th-century house
Cumberland County Prehistorical Museum		Greenwich Township	Cumberland	South Jersey	Archaeology	website, operated by the Cumberland County Historical Society, stone and bone artifacts, pottery, native crafts, fossils
Delaware Bay Museum		Bivalve	Cumberland	South Jersey	Maritime	website, operated by the Bayshore Center at Bivalve, oyster industry and shipping
Dennis Township Museum and History Center		Dennis Township	Cape May	South Jersey	Local history	website, located in the Old School House
DePace Sports Museum and Library		Collingswood	Camden	Delaware River Region	Sports	website, Sports history museum and library based on the collections of Dr. Nicholas L. DePace
Denville Historical Society & Museum		Denville	Morris	Skylands Region	Local history	
Dey Mansion		Wayne	Passaic	Gateway Region	Historic house	General George Washington's revolutionary war headquarters in the Preakness Valley
Discovery Shell Museum		Ocean City	Cape May	South Jersey	Natural history	Retail store with museum display of over 10,000 species of seashells from all over the world
Double Trouble State Park		Bayville	Ocean	Shore Region	Open-air	Includes Double Trouble Historic Village, a former company town, a sawmill, and a cranberry sorting and packing house
Dover History Museum		Dover	Morris	Skylands Region	Local history	website, operated by the Dover Area Historical Society
Dr. William Robinson Plantation Museum		Clark	Union	Gateway Region	Historic house	House dating back to 1690, operated by the Clark Historical Society
Drake House Museum		Plainfield	Union	Gateway Region	Local history	Building owned by the City of Plainfield, museum operated by the Historical Society of Plainfield
Drumthwacket		Princeton	Mercer	Delaware River Region	Historic house	Official residence of the governor of New Jersey, built in 1835
East Brunswick Museum		East Brunswick	Middlesex	Gateway Region	Local history	website Located in Old Bridge
East Jersey Olde Towne Village		Piscataway	Middlesex	Gateway Region	Open air	Includes church, tavern, schoolhouse, blacksmith shop, barracks and several homes
East Point Light		Heislerville	Cumberland	South Jersey	Maritime	
Eatontown Historical Museum		Eatontown	Monmouth	Shore Region	Local history	
Edward Compton House		Mauricetown	Cumberland	South Jersey	Historic house	Late 19th-century Victorian house, operated by the Mauricetown Historical Society
Edelman Fossil Park		Mantua Township	Gloucester	Delaware River Region	Science	Rowan University museum on a former marl quarry with 66-million-year-old fossils; the $73 million museum opened on March 29, 2025, and visitors can dig for fossils in the quarry
Ellis Island		Jersey City	Hudson	Gateway Region	History	Museum of immigration; ferry boats depart from Liberty State Park
Ely House Museum		Hightstown	Mercer	Delaware River Region	Historic house	website, operated by the Hightstown-East Windsor Historical Society
Emlen Physick Estate		Cape May	Cape May	South Jersey	Living	Victorian mansion, operated by the Mid-Atlantic Center for the Arts
Firehouse Gallery		Bordentown	Burlington	Delaware River Region	Art	Focuses on work of artist Eric Gibbons
The Fleetwood Museum of Art and Photographica		North Plainfield	Somerset	Skylands Region	Photography	website, cameras, photographic equipment, art and science of photography
Fort Hancock Historic District		Middletown Township	Monmouth	Shore Region	Multiple	Part of Gateway National Recreation Area, includes the former coast artillery fort, Sandy Hook Light, the largest concentration of sea coast artillery batteries, site of first Army proving ground, 1894 USLSS Spermaceti Cove lifesaving station, only complete Nike missile site in the eastern United States and the intact 19th-century Fort Hancock community
Fort Lee Historic Park		Fort Lee	Bergen	Gateway Region	Military	American Revolution fort site, center has exhibits about the fort
Fort Lee Museum		Fort Lee	Bergen	Gateway Region	Local history	Operated by the Fort Lee Historical Society, located in the 1922 Judge Moore House, adjacent to Monument Park
Foster–Armstrong House		Montague	Sussex	Skylands Region	Historic house	Facebook site, operated by the Montague Association for Restoration of Community History, late 19th-century house
Fosterfields Living Historical Farm		Morris Township	Morris	Skylands Region	Agriculture	website, operated by the Morris County Park Commission, working farm, using the tools, techniques, and materials of a turn-of-the-century farm
Franklin Mineral Museum		Franklin	Sussex	Skylands Region	Natural history	Over 4000 mineral specimens with a large display of fluorescent minerals, mine replica, fossils, Native American artifacts
Friar Mountain Model Railroad Museum		Sparta	Sussex	Skylands Region	Railroad	website, model train displays, also American Revolutionary War history
Garden State Discovery Museum		Cherry Hill	Camden	Delaware River Region	Children's	
Garretson Forge and Farm		Fair Lawn	Bergen	Gateway Region	Living	Living Dutch farm museum
George F. Boyer Historical Museum		Wildwood	Cape May	South Jersey	Local history	website, operated by the Wildwood Historical Society, includes National Marbles Hall of Fame
George Segal Gallery		Montclair	Essex	Gateway Region	Art	website, part of Montclair State University
Gibbon House Museum		Greenwich Township	Cumberland	South Jersey	Historic house	website, 1730 furnished house, barn museum with 18th-century tools, doctor's office, Swedish granary log building, operated by the Cumberland County Historical Society
Giffordtown Schoolhouse Museum		Little Egg Harbor Township	Ocean	Shore Region	Local history	website, operated by the Tuckerton Historical Society, Tuckerton Wireless, telephone equipment, Native American artifacts, railroad, maritime, area businesses and industries
Gloucester County Police Museum		Woodbury	Gloucester	Delaware River Region	Law enforcement	
Greenfield Hall		Haddonfield	Camden	Delaware River Region	Local history	Operated by the Historical Society of Haddonfield, houses collections of furniture from the 18th and 19th centuries, early New Jersey glass, needlework samplers and costumes dating back to the 18th century, pottery exhibit, doll and toy collection, tool museum
Griffith Morgan House		Pennsauken Township	Camden	Delaware River Region	Historic house	1715 stone house, open for special events, 3rd floor museum of local history
Grover Cleveland Birthplace		Caldwell	Essex	Gateway Region	Historic house	Birthplace of President Grover Cleveland, artifacts from the 1830s to 1850s
Grounds for Sculpture		Hamilton	Mercer	Delaware River Region	Art	35-acre (140,000 m^{2}) sculpture park and indoor art gallery
Dirck Gulick House		Montgomery Township	Somerset	Skylands Region	Historic house	website, operated by the Van Harlingen Historical Society
Hackettstown Historical Society Museum		Hackettstown	Warren	Skylands Region	Local history	website
Hageman Farm		Somerset	Somerset	Skylands Region	Historic house	19th-century farmhouse and barns, open for events, operated by the Meadows Foundation
Hamilton–Van Wagoner House Museum		Clifton	Passaic	Gateway Region	Historic house	website, operated by the City of Clifton, 18th-century Dutch farmhouse with rooms decorated in many different period styles, also known as the Hamilton House Museum
Hammonton Arts Center		Hammonton	Atlantic	South Jersey	Art	website
Hancock House		Lower Alloways Creek Township	Salem	Delaware River Region	Historic house	Mid-18th-century house, site of the 1778 Hancock's Bridge massacre
Harriet Tubman Museum		Cape May	Cape May	South Jersey	Historic house	website, life and work of Harriet Tubman, former Macedonia Baptist Church Parsonage
Havens Homestead Museum		Brick	Ocean	Shore Region	Historic house	website, operated by the Brick Township Historical Society
Hereford Inlet Light		Wildwood	Cape May	South Jersey	Lighthouse	Victorian style keepers house and lighthouse
Heritage Glass Museum		Glassboro	Gloucester	Delaware River Region	Art	Area historic glass making and contemporary glass art
The Heritage Museum at Meadow Breeze Park		Washington	Warren	Northwestern Jersey	Local history	The Heritage Museum at Meadow Breeze Park is a nonprofit museum in Washington, New Jersey, that showcases the rich history of Warren County's Pohatcong Valley through seven rooms of exhibits covering transportation, education, business, the Morris Canal, Native American culture, and local township history.
The Hermitage		Ho-Ho-Kus	Bergen	Gateway Region	Historic house	18th-century Gothic revival home
Hill Memorial Museum		Newton	Sussex	Skylands Region	Local history	Operated by the Sussex County Historical Society
Hiram Blauvelt Art Museum		Oradell	Bergen	Gateway Region	Art	website, wildlife art
Historical Society of Bloomfield Museum		Bloomfield	Essex	Gateway Region	Local history	website, located in the children's wing of the Bloomfield Public Library
Historic Cold Spring Village		Cold Spring	Cape May	South Jersey	Open air	website, Early American (1790–1840) open-air living history museum, open late May through mid-September
Historic Longstreet Farm		Holmdel	Monmouth	Shore Region	Living	1890s living historical farm located in Holmdel Park
Historic New Bridge Landing		River Edge	Bergen	Gateway Region	Historic houses	Operated by the Bergen County Historical Society and HNBLPC, American Revolutionary War battleground site, includes the Steuben House that served as Gen. Washington's headquarters in 1780, Campbell-Christie House, Demarest House Museum, Westervelt-Thomas Barn and 1889 Swing Bridge. Jersey–Dutch architecture. BCHS collections/artifacts, made or used in Bergen County, are on exhibit.
Historic Speedwell		Morristown	Morris	Skylands Region	Open air	Former ironworks, place where Alfred Vail and Samuel Morse first demonstrated the electric telegraph, includes nine buildings furnished to depict life at Speedwell during the early 19th century
Historic Walnford		Upper Freehold	Monmouth	Shore Region	Open air	website, 1754 Waln House, operating 19th-century gristmill and farm buildings on 36 acres (150,000 m^{2})
Historical Society of Penns Grove, Carneys Point and Oldmans Museum		Penns Grove	Salem	Delaware River Region	Local history	website
Hoboken Historical Museum		Hoboken	Hudson	Gateway Region	Local history	
Hoboken Fire Museum		Hoboken	Hudson	Gateway Region	Firefighting	
Holcombe-Jimison Farmstead Museum		Delaware Township	Hunterdon	Skylands Region	Agriculture	website, includes print shop, woodworking shop, kitchen, John Holcombe House, doctor/dentist office, timber working tools, dairy exhibit, loom, blacksmith shop, tractor barn
Holmes-Hendrickson House		Holmdel	Monmouth	Shore Region	Historic house	Operated by the Monmouth County Historical Association Museum, 1754 Dutch farm house
Hope Historical Society Museum		Hope	Warren	Skylands Region	Local history	
Hopewell Museum		Hopewell	Mercer	Delaware River Region	Local history	Includes antiques, Native American artifacts
Hopper-Goetschius House		Upper Saddle River	Bergen	Gateway Region	Living	Operated by the Upper Saddle River Historical Society, early-18th-century house
Howell Living History Farm		Hopewell Township	Mercer	Delaware River Region	Agriculture	Facility of the Mercer County Park Commission; 1900 living farm museum
Hunterdon Art Museum		Clinton	Hunterdon	Skylands Region	Art	website, contemporary art, craft and design
Hunterdon County Historical Society		Flemington	Hunterdon	Skylands Region	Historic house	Operates the mid 19th-century Empire period Doric House by appointment and for events
Hunter-Lawrence-Jessup House		Woodbury	Gloucester	Delaware River Region	Local history	Operated by the Gloucester County Historical Society
Imagine That Discovery Museum for Children		Florham Park	Morris	Skylands Region	Children's	website
Indian King Tavern Museum		Haddonfield	Camden	Delaware River Region	Historic tavern	Built in 1750, site where New Jersey was legally created
InfoAge		Wall	Monmouth	Shore Region	Multiple	website, located at Camp Evans, includes National Broadcasters Hall of Fame, New Jersey shipwrecks, military electronics, computers, vintage radios
Insectropolis		Toms River	Ocean	Shore Region	Natural history	website, live and mounted insects, interactive exhibits
Ireland Hoffer House		Williamstown	Gloucester	Delaware River Region	Historic house	Facebook site, operated by the Monroe Township Historical Society
Isaac Watson House		Hamilton	Mercer	Delaware River Region	Historic house	18th-century house, headquarters of the New Jersey State Society of the National Society of the Daughters of the American Revolution
Island Heights Cottage Museum		Island Heights	Ocean	Shore Region	Local history	website, operated by the Island Heights Cultural & Heritage Association
Jacobus Vanderveer House & Museum		Bedminster	Somerset	Skylands Region	Historic house	18th-century Dutch frame house associated with the Pluckemin encampment of 1778-79
James Wilson Marshall House		Lambertville	Hunterdon	Skylands Region	Historic house	Operated by the Lambertville Historical Society, mid-19th-century period house
Jersey City Museum		Jersey City	Hudson	Gateway Region	Art	American visual art and material culture, currently closed
Jersey Explorer Children's Museum		East Orange	Essex	Gateway Region	Children's	website
Jersey Shore Children's Museum		Mays Landing	Atlantic	South Jersey	Children's	website, hands-on discovery center that stimulates creativity, imagination and learning through interactive play
Jewish Heritage Museum of Monmouth County		Freehold Township	Monmouth	Shore Region	Ethnic - Jewish	website
Jewish Museum of New Jersey		Newark	Essex	Gateway Region	Ethnic - Jewish	Oldest synagogue in continuous use in Newark, exhibitions
Jim and Mary Lee Museum		Port Warren	Warren	Skylands Region	History	Site of Morris Canal Inclined Plane 9 West, canal buildings and turbine
Jim Kirk Maritime Room		Linwood	Atlantic	South Jersey	Maritime	Operated by the Linwood Historical Society at the Linwood Library, ship models, maritime displays
John Abbot II House		Hamilton	Mercer	Delaware River Region	Historic house	website, 1730 colonial house, operated by the Historical Society of Hamilton Township
John Ballantine House		Newark	Essex	Gateway Region	Historic house	Part of the Newark Museum, late 19th-century mansion with eight period rooms, two hallways and six thematic galleries of decorative arts
John DuBois Maritime Museum		Greenwich Township	Cumberland	South Jersey	Maritime	website, operated by the Cumberland County Historical Society, builders' models of local craft, tools, blocks, riggings
John F. Peto Studio Museum		Island Heights	Ocean	Shore Region	Historic house	House and studio of trompe-l'œil artist John F. Peto
Kearney House		Alpine	Bergen	Gateway Region	Historic house	18th-century house, also known as Blackledge-Kearney House or Cornwallis Headquarters; part of the New Jersey portion of the Palisades Interstate Park
Kearny Cottage		Perth Amboy	Middlesex	Gateway Region	Historic house	Late 18th-century house, operated by Kearny Cottage Historical Society
Kearney Museum		Kearney	Hudson	Gateway Region	Local history	Located in the Kearney Public Library
Keyport Fire Museum		Keyport	Monmouth	Shore Region	Firefighting	Fire department history and fire prevention
Kidsbridge Tolerance Museum		Ewing	Mercer	Delaware River Region	Children's	website, focus is understanding and interacting with racial and ethnic differences, open by appointment
King Store & Homestead Museum		Ledgewood	Morris	Skylands Region	Historic house	Operated by the Roxbury Historic Trust
Kirby's Mill		Medford	Burlington	Delaware River Region	Mill	Restored grist mill dating to 1778
Kuser Farm Mansion		Hamilton	Mercer	Delaware River Region	Historic house	website, late 19th-century mansion and outbuildings
Lacey Schoolhouse Museum		Forked River	Ocean	Shore Region	Local history	website, operated by the Lacey Historical Society
Lake Hopatcong Historical Museum		Landing	Morris	Skylands Region	Local history	website, located on the grounds of Hopatcong State Park
Lakehurst Historical Museum		Lakehurst	Ocean	Shore Region Wednesdays & Sundays from 12:30 P.M. to 3:P.M	Local history	website, operated by the Borough of Lakehurst Historical Society
Lakewood Heritage Museum		Lakewood	Ocean	Shore Region	Local history	website
Lambert Castle		Paterson	Passaic	Gateway Region	Historic house	Operated by the Passaic County Historical Society, late-19th-century period rooms and changing exhibits about Passaic County history
Latvian Ethnographic Museum		Howell	Monmouth	Shore Region	Ethnic	website, information, folk costumes, hand woven belts and blankets, colorful knitted woolen mittens, jewelry, operated by the NJ Latvian Society
Leedsville Schoolhouse		Linwood	Atlantic	South Jersey	Local history	Operated by the Linwood Historical Society, exhibits of local history and culture
"Lest We Forget" - Black Holocaust Museum of Slavery		Lawnside	Camden	Delaware River Region	History	website, private collection of slavery artifacts and Jim Crow memorabilia, available by appointment
Liberty Hall Museum		Elizabeth	Union	Gateway Region	Historic house	Victorian style mansion, located at Kean University
Liberty Science Center		Jersey City	Hudson	Gateway Region	Science	Located in Liberty State Park
Little Red Schoolhouse		Lyndhurst	Bergen	Gateway Region	Local history	Operated by the Lyndhurst Historical Society
Little Red Schoolhouse Museum		Waretown	Ocean	Shore Region	School	Operated by the Waretown Historical Society
Long Beach Island Foundation of the Arts and Sciences		Loveladies	Ocean	Shore Region	Art	website, free public art gallery
Long Beach Island Museum		Beach Haven	Ocean	Shore Region	Local history	website, operated by the Long Beach Island Historical Association
Long Pond Ironworks State Park		Hewitt	Passaic	Gateway Region	Industry	Includes Long Pond Ironworks Museum
Longport Museum		Longport	Atlantic	South Jersey	Local history	Operated by the Longport Historical Society
Macculloch Hall Historical Museum		Morristown	Morris	Skylands Region	Historic house	website, showcases 18th- and 19th-century American and English fine and decorative arts
Magnolia Train Station Museum		Magnolia	Camden	Delaware River Region	Local history	website, operated by the Magnolia Historical Society
MacKenzie Museum		Howell	Monmouth	Shore Region	Historic house	website, operated by the Howell Historical Society
Mana Contemporary		Jersey City	Hudson	Gateway Region	Art	Exhibition space for contemporary art, includes the Richard Meier Model Museum
Margate Historical Society Museum		Margate	Atlantic	South Jersey	Local history	New museum planned in Margate City Hall
Marine Mammal Stranding Center		Brigantine	Atlantic	South Jersey	Natural history	Wildlife rehabilitation center for marine animals, includes natural history museum
Marlpit Hall		Middletown	Monmouth	Shore Region	Historic house	Operated by the Monmouth County Historical Association, 1756 home that is a stop on the New Jersey Women's Heritage Trail
Maywood Station Museum		Maywood	Bergen	Gateway Region	Railway	Historic train station and exhibits of railroad artifacts
Mead–Van Duyne House		Wayne	Passaic	Gateway Region	Historic house	Dutch stone colonial house, on the same property as the Van Riper-Hopper House
Meadowlands Museum		Rutherford	Bergen	Gateway Region	Local history	Antique toys, rocks and minerals, period rooms, changing exhibits
Merchants and Drovers Tavern Museum		Rahway	Union	Gateway Region	Historic tavern	Early tavern life and stagecoach transportation
Metlar–Bodine House Museum		Piscataway	Middlesex	Gateway Region	Historic house	Plans to add exhibit on Ross Hall
Millbrook Village		Blairstown	Warren	Skylands Region	Living	website, located in the Delaware Water Gap National Recreation Area, recreated turn-of-the-century village
Millburn-Short Hills Historical Society Museum		Short Hills	Essex	Gateway Region	Local history	website, located at the Short Hills train station
Miller-Cory House		Westfield	Union	Gateway Region	Living	18th-century farmhouse with costumed docents demonstrating colonial crafts
Millville Army Air Field Museum		Millville	Cumberland	South Jersey	Aviation	website, located at the Millville Municipal Airport, Millville's role in aviation history and the history of the P-47 Thunderbolt
Monmouth Battlefield State Park		Manalapan	Monmouth	Shore Region	Military	American Revolutionary War battlefield site, visitor center exhibits and 18th-century Craig House
Monmouth County Historical Association Museum		Freehold	Monmouth	Shore Region	Local history	Includes art, furniture, ceramics, textiles, military artifacts
Monmouth Museum		Lincroft	Monmouth	Shore Region	Multiple	website, art, cultural history and science, children's wing and planetarium, located on the campus of Brookdale Community College
Montclair Art Museum		Montclair	Essex	Gateway Region	Art	Collections include Hudson River School, portraiture, American Impressionism, the American Scene, Modernism, Abstract Expressionism and 20th-century works by African-American artists
Montville Township Museum		Montville	Morris	Skylands Region	Local history	operated by the Montville Township Historical Society
Morris Museum		Morristown	Morris	Skylands Region	Multiple	website, Costumes and textiles, fine art, decorative art, dolls and toys, natural science, geology, paleontology, anthropology
Morris Plains Museum		Morris Plains	Morris	Skylands Region	Local history	website
Morristown National Historical Park		Morristown	Morris	Skylands Region	History	Three sites important during the American Revolution: the Ford Mansion, a historic house museum, Fort Nonsense and Jockey Hollow
Morven Museum & Garden		Princeton	Mercer	Delaware River Region	Historic house	Former New Jersey Governor's Mansion and 18th-century home of Richard Stockton, museum showcases the cultural heritage of New Jersey through fine, folk, and decorative arts
Moses D. Heath Farm		Middletown	Monmouth	Shore Region	Agriculture	website, agriculture and horticulture exhibits
Mount Tabor Historical Society Museum		Mount Tabor	Morris	Skylands Region	Local history	website, located at the Short Hills train station
Mullica Township Historical Society & Museum		Nesco	Atlantic	South Jersey	Local history	website, located in the former building of Hilda S Frame School
Museum of Cape May County		Cape May Court House	Cape May	South Jersey	History	Furnishings, costumes, tools, decorative and practical objects from the 17th to 20th centuries, including Native American and maritime exhibits in the historic John Holmes House.
Museum of Early Trades and Crafts		Madison	Morris	Skylands Region	History	History and lifeways of ordinary people of pre-industrial New Jersey, including hand tools, products and household objects
Museum of Russian Art		Jersey City	Hudson	Gateway Region	Art	Contemporary Russian art
Museum of the Historical Society of Ocean Grove		Ocean Grove	Monmouth	Shore Region	Local history	website, artifacts relative to the history of Ocean Grove, the Holiness Movement, Camp Meetings, Methodism, Monmouth County & 19th-century life
Museum of the American Hungarian Foundation		New Brunswick	Middlesex	Gateway Region	Ethnic - Hungarian	website, Hungarian immigrant life including fine art, folk art and folk life
Museum of White Township		White Township	Warren	Skylands Region	Local history	Operated by the White Township Historical Society
Nail House Museum		Bridgeton	Cumberland	South Jersey	Local history	
National Guard Militia Museum of New Jersey		Sea Girt	Monmouth	Shore Region	Military	Role of the New Jersey Militia and National Guard in state history
National Guard Militia Museum of New Jersey		Lawrenceville	Mercer	Shore Region	Military	Includes weapons, uniforms and other equipment, 20 tanks, vehicles and cannon
Naval Air Station Wildwood Aviation Museum		Lower Township	Cape May	South Jersey	Aviation	Located at Cape May Airport, aircraft, engines, aviation artifacts, military memorabilia, aircraft engines and more housed in a 92,000-square-foot (8,500 m^{2}) all-wooden hangar
Navesink Twin Lights		Highlands	Monmouth	Shore Region	Lighthouse	Lighthouse and museum
Navy Lakehurst Information Center		Lakehurst	Ocean	Shore Region	Aviation	website, open by appointment only, collections of the Navy Lakehurst Historical Society, history of the Naval Air Engineering Station Lakehurst, home to airships and site of Hindenburg Disaster, tours of Lakehurst Hangar No. 1
Nelden-Roberts Stonehouse		Montague	Sussex	Skylands Region	Historic house	website, operated by the Montague Association for Restoration of Community History
Newark Museum		Newark	Essex	Gateway Region	Multiple	A museum of art and science; American art, decorative arts, and arts of Asia, Africa, the Americas and the ancient world; Planetarium, Victoria Hall of Science, natural science collections in geology, fossils and botany; Ballantine House, Newark Fire Museum and 1784 Old Stone Schoolhouse
New Jersey Firefighters Museum		Boonton	Morris	Skylands Region	Firefighting	website, part of the New Jersey Firemen's Home, exhibits include steamers, ornate hose carts and fire trucks
New Jersey Historical Society		Newark	Essex	Gateway Region	History	Museum collections include costumes, furniture, paintings, prints, ceramics, glass, tools and more, also houses library and archives
New Jersey Maritime Museum		Beach Haven	Ocean	Shore Region	Maritime	website
New Jersey Museum of Boating		Point Pleasant	Ocean	Shore Region	Maritime	website
New Jersey Museum of Transportation		Wall	Monmouth	Shore Region	Railroad	Located in Allaire State Park, heritage narrow gauge railway and displays
New Jersey Naval Museum		Hackensack	Bergen	Gateway Region	Maritime	Home of USS Ling (SS-297), a World War II submarine
New Jersey State House		Trenton	Mercer	Delaware River Region	State capitol	
New Jersey State Museum		Trenton	Mercer	Delaware River Region	Multiple	Archaeology/ethnology, cultural history, fine art and natural history
New Jersey State Police Museum and Learning Center		West Trenton	Mercer	Delaware River Region	Law enforcement	website
New Jersey Vietnam Veterans Memorial		Holmdel	Monmouth	Shore Region	Military	Museum, memorial and education center
New Sweden Farmstead Museum		Bridgeton	Cumberland	South Jersey	Open air	Reproduction of a 17th-century farmstead of the type built by early Swedish Finnish colonists
Newton Fire Museum		Newton	Sussex	Skylands Region	Firefighting	website
Northfield Museum and Casto House		Northfield	Atlantic	South Jersey	Local history	Located in Birch Grove Park
Northlandz		Flemington	Hunterdon	Skylands Region	Multiple	Miniature railway with 8 miles (13 km) of track, a 94-room dollhouse, doll museum, music hall, art gallery and Raritan River Railway steam train ride
Noyes Museum of Art		Oceanville	Atlantic	South Jersey	Art	website, part of Stockton University, contemporary and historic art
Nutley Museum		Nutley	Essex	Gateway Region	Local history	Operated by the Nutley Historical Society, includes Annie Oakley memorabilia, general store, toys and local history artifacts
Ocean City Arts Center		Ocean City	Cape May	South Jersey	Art	website, monthly art exhibits
Ocean City Historical Museum		Ocean City	Cape May	South Jersey	Local history	website, located in Ocean City's Community and Cultural Center
Ocean County Museum		Toms River	Ocean	Shore Region	Historic house	website, operated by the Ocean County Historical Society, Victorian period Pierson–Sculthorp House with period rooms, exhibits on local history
Ocean Gate Museum		Ocean Gate	Ocean	Shore Region	Railroad	website, historic railroad station with railroad and local history displays
Old Ardena Schoolhouse		Howell	Monmouth	Shore Region	School	website, operated by the Howell Historical Society
Old Barracks Museum		Trenton	Mercer	Delaware River Region	History	American colonial life and the American Revolution
Old Dutch Parsonage		Somerville	Somerset	Skylands Region	Historic house	Adjacent to the Wallace House, 18th-century parsonage
Old Millstone Forge Museum		Millstone	Somerset	Skylands Region	Mill	website, restored blacksmith shop with demonstrations
Old Monroe School House		Hardyston Township	Sussex	Skylands Region	School	One room schoolhouse used from 1819 to 1926, operated by the Hardyston Heritage Society
Old Schoolhouse and Firehouse Museum		Ogdensburg	Sussex	Skylands Region	School	website, open by appointment by the Ogdensburg Historical Society
Olde Stone House Historic Village		Washington Township	Gloucester	Delaware River Region	Open air	Operated by the Washington Township Historic Preservation Commission
Pascack Historical Society Museum		Park Ridge	Bergen	Gateway Region	Local history	website
Paterson Museum		Paterson	Passaic	Gateway Region	Local history	Cultural, industrial, technological, and geological history of Paterson; home of Fenian Ram submarine
Paul Robeson Galleries		Newark	Essex	Gateway Region	Art	website, part of Rutgers University
Paulsdale		Mount Laurel	Burlington	Delaware River Region	Biographical	Home of suffragette Alice Paul
Peachfield		Westampton Township	Burlington	Delaware River Region	Historic house	18th-century house open for events by The National Society of the Colonial Dames of America
Pennsville Township Historical Society Museum		Pennsville Township	Salem	Delaware River Region	Local history	website, also known as the Church Landing Farm Museum
Pequannock Museum		Pompton Plains	Morris	Skylands Region	Local history	Located in a historic railroad station
Perkins Center for the Arts		Collingswood	Camden	Delaware River Region	Art	Visual and performing arts classes and lessons, exhibitions, music and dance performances, workshops, visiting artists' residencies and an outreach program
Perkins Center for the Arts		Moorestown	Burlington	Delaware River Region	Art	Visual and performing arts classes and lessons, exhibitions, music and dance performances, workshops, visiting artists' residencies and an outreach program
Perth Amboy Ferry Slip		Perth Amboy	Middlesex	Gateway Region	Maritime	
Peter Mott House		Lawnside	Camden	Delaware River Region	History	website, operated by the Lawnside Historical Society; station house along the Underground Railroad
Phillipsburg Railroad Historians Museum		Phillipsburg	Warren	Skylands Region	Railroad	website
Point Pleasant Historical Society Museum		Point Pleasant	Ocean	Shore Region	Local history	website
Pomona Hall		Camden	Camden	Delaware River Region	Historic house	Operated by the Camden County Historical Society, 18th-century period decorated mansion
Poricy Park		Middletown	Monmouth	Shore Region	Multiple	Includes 18th-century Murray Farmhouse and barn open for events and a nature center with fossils and natural history displays
Port Mercer Canal House		Lawrenceville	Mercer	Delaware River Region	Historic house	Operated by the Lawrenceville Historical Society, restored 1890-1920 period house for the bridgetender and his family along the Delaware and Raritan Canal, open by appointment
Prallsville Mills		Prallsville	Hunterdon	Skylands Region	Open air	Includes an 1877 grist mill, a 1790 linseed oil mill, an 1850 saw mill and a 1900 grain silo
Princeton University Art Museum		Princeton	Mercer	Delaware River Region	Art	Mediterranean regions, Western Europe, China, United States, and Latin America
Printmaking Council of New Jersey		Somerville	Somerset	Skylands Region	Art	Classes, workshops and gallery with changing exhibits of prints
Proprietary House		Perth Amboy	Middlesex	Gateway Region	Historic house	Commissioned by the Proprietors of East Jersey to be the official residence of the Royal Governor William Franklin
Prospertown Schoolhouse Museum		Jackson	Ocean	Shore Region	School	Open by appointment
Ralston General Store		Ralston	Morris	Skylands Region	Historic store	website, operated by the Ralston Historical Association, 1785 general store and post office
Randolph Museum		Randolph	Morris	Skylands Region	Local history	website, operated by the Historical Society of Old Randolph
Readington Township Museums		Readington Township	Hunterdon	Skylands Region	Multiple	website, includes Bouman-Stickney Farmstead, Eversole-Hall House, Cold Brook School, and Taylor's Mill.
Red Bank Battlefield Park		National Park	Gloucester	Delaware River Region	Historic house	James and Ann Whitall House, 18th-century plantation house and battlefield site during the American Revolutionary War
Red Brick Schoolhouse Museum		Chatham Township	Morris	Skylands	Local history	website, operated by the Chatham Township Historical Society
Red Mill Museum Village		Clinton	Hunterdon	Skylands Region	Open air	Historic grist mill and former quarry village, exhibits of area industry, agriculture and domestic history
Richard Meier Model Museum		Jersey City	Hudson	Gateway Region	Architecture	Exhibition of architectural projects, sculptures and collages by Richard Meier, located in Mana Contemporary
Dixon Mills		Jersey City	Hudson	Gateway Region	Architecture	Exhibition of architectural projects, sculptures and collages by Richard Meier, located in Mana Contemporary
Ridgewood Schoolhouse Museum		Ridgewood	Bergen	Gateway Region	Local history	website, operated by the Ridgewood Historical Society
Ringwood Manor		Ringwood	Passaic	Gateway Region	Historic house	Located in Ringwood State Park, 19th- and 20th-century great estate mansion
Ripley's Believe It or Not! Museum		Atlantic City	Atlantic	South Jersey	Odditorium	
Risley Homestead		Northfield	Atlantic	South Jersey	Historic house	website, 1790 cottage, operated by the Atlantic County Historical Society
Riverfront Renaissance Center for the Arts		Millville	Cumberland	South Jersey	Art	website, community nonprofit arts center with four gallery spaces
Rockingham		Kingston	Somerset	Skylands Region	Living	Also known as Judge John Berrien Mansion, preserved and interpreted as the headquarters of George Washington in 1783
Roebling Museum		Roebling	Burlington	Delaware River Region	Industry	website, located at former John A. Roebling's Sons Company steel mill
Rosenkrans Museum		Walpack Township	Sussex	Skylands Region	Local history	website, operated by the Walpack Historical Society
Roundhouse Museum		Egg Harbor City	Atlantic	South Jersey	Local history	website, operated by the Egg Harbor City Historical Society
Rutgers University Geology Museum		New Brunswick	Middlesex	Gateway Region	Natural history	Exhibits on geology and anthropology, with an emphasis on the natural history of New Jersey
Rutherfurd Hall		Allamuchy Township	Warren	Skylands Region	Historic house	20th-century mansion, also community culture center
Salem County Historical Society		Salem	Salem	Delaware River Region	Historic houses	website, four interconnected historic houses, the centerpiece of which is 1721 Alexander Grant's Mansion House, with exhibits including Salem in the Revolutionary War and Wistarburg Glass
Sam Azeez Museum of Woodbine Heritage		Woodbine	Cape May	South Jersey	Local history	Area Russian Jewish immigrants, local history and culture
Samuel Fleming House		Flemington	Hunterdon	Skylands Region	Historic house	1756 house with history programs, also known as Fleming Castle
Scansen173		Princeton Junction	Mercer	Delaware River Region	Art	website, 112 abstract and surreal sculptures, installations, assemblages, pond, bridge, wellness trails,300 elderly trees, and a Zen garden,
Schoolhouse Museum		Ridgewood	Bergen	Gateway Region	Local History	https://ridgewoodhistoricalsociety.org/1 room schoolhouse built in 1872 that was turned into a museum for the history of the village of Ridgewood and holds many Revolutionary War artifacts.
Schuyler-Colfax Historic House Museum		Wayne	Passaic	Gateway Region	Historic house	Operated by the Wayne Township Parks and Recreation Department, 1695 colonial house
Schuyler-Hamilton House		Morristown	Morris	Skylands Region	Historic house	website, also known as the Jabez Campfield House, operated by the Morristown chapter of the Daughters of the American Revolution; 1760 four bedroom, Georgian style house
Seabrook Educational and Cultural Center		Seabrook	Cumberland	South Jersey	Local history	website, history of Seabrook Farms Company and its diverse workers: relocated Japanese Americans and Japanese Peruvians from the U.S. internment camps, wartime refugees from Europe, migrant laborers from Appalachia, the Deep South, and the Caribbean
Sea Girt Lighthouse		Sea Girt	Monmouth	Shore Region	Maritime	Tours of the lighthouse and keeper's house
Sea Isle City Historical Museum		Sea Isle City	Cape May	South Jersey	Local history	website, located in the Sea Isle City branch of the Cape May County Library
Shippen Manor Museum		Oxford	Warren	Skylands Region	Historic house	Operated by the Warren County Cultural & Heritage Commission, restored 18th-century stone mansion
Skylands Manor		Ringwood	Passaic	Gateway Region	Historic house	Located in Ringwood State Park, 1920s forty-four-room English Jacobean mansion, open one Sunday a month, 96-acre (390,000 m2) botanical garden
Skylands Museum of Art		Lafayette	Sussex	Skylands Region	Art	website Skylands Museum of Art is dedicated to the collection and display of works of sculpture and painting that express the human spirit, imagination and history of fantasy.
Silas Riggs House		Ledgewood	Morris	Skylands Region	Historic house	website, 18th-century period house, operated by the Roxbury Township Historical Society
Silverball Museum	Most of the pinball machines are lit up and ready to play, except for a couple with the playing field opened up for repairs. Informative signs stand on top of each machine, describing its history and importance. It's night and attendance at the museum is relatively light.	Asbury Park	Monmouth	Shore Region	Amusement	website, pinball museum and arcade
Smith–Cadbury Mansion		Moorestown	Burlington	Delaware River Region	Historic house	website, Operated by the Historical Society of Moorestown
Snowmobile Barn Museum		Fredon	Sussex	Skylands Region	Transportation	website, collection of over 300 sleds along with toys, ornaments, jewelry, advertisements
Solitude Heritage Museum		Union	Hunterdon	Skylands Region	Multiple	website, early Hunterdon history, environmental and cultural center, operated by the Union Forge Heritage Association in the 1760 Joseph Turner House
Somers Point Historical Museum		Somers Point	Atlantic	South Jersey	Local history	website, operated by the Somers Point Historical Society
Somerville Fire Department Museum		Somerville	Somerset	Skylands Region	Firefighting	Old fire engines and memorabilia
South Jersey Museum		Glassboro	Gloucester	Delaware River Region	History	website, includes Precolumbian Native American artifacts, Colonial items, the Pine Barrens, antique tools and equipment, area political history, farmsteads
Space Farms Zoo and Museum		Sussex	Sussex	Skylands Region	Multiple	Zoo with over 500 animals, museum includes antique cars, motorcycles, carriages and wagons, exhibits about Eskimos, Fluorescent minerals, weapons and rifles, tool barn, dolls and toys, blacksmith shop, miniature circus, train set, Native American arrowheads and artifacts, farm machinery
Spring Lake Historical Society Museum		Spring Lake	Monmouth	Shore Region	Local history	website
Stafford Township Heritage Park		Stafford Township	Ocean	Shore Region	Open air	website, operated by the Stafford Township Historical Society, includes a historic church, store, railroad station, cottage, and 2 cemeteries
Statue of Liberty National Monument		Jersey City	Hudson	Gateway Region	History	Accessible by boat from Liberty State Park, includes the Statue of Liberty on Liberty Island and Ellis Island and its immigration museum
Steamboat Dock Museum		Keyport	Monmouth	Shore Region	Local history	website, operated by the Keyport Historical Society, exhibits include plantation century, docks and shipping, steamboat building, oyster industry and other local companies
Stedman Gallery		Camden	Camden	Delaware River Region	Art	website, part of the Rutgers–Camden Center for the Arts at Rutgers–Camden
Sterling Hill Mining Museum		Ogdensburg	Sussex	Skylands Region	Geology	Underground zinc mine and Thomas S. Warren Museum of Fluorescence
Stephen Crane House		Asbury Park	Monmouth	Shore Region	Biographical	website, home of author Stephen Crane
Stickley Museum at Craftsman Farms		Parsipanny	Morris	Skylands Region	Historic house	Craftsman-style home of Gustav Stickley
Stillwater Historical Museum		Stillwater	Sussex	Skylands Region	Local history	website, located in an old school house, operated by the Historical Society of Stillwater Township
Stone Harbor Museum		Stone Harbor	Cape May	South Jersey	Local history	website, open seasonally
Stone Museum		Monroe Township	Middlesex	Gateway Region	Geology	website, minerals, fossils, tools, fluorescent minerals room
Stoutsburg Sourland African American Museum (SSAAM)		Skillman, New Jersey	Somerset	Skylands Region	African American	website, located in a historic AME church, state and local African American history and culture
Sussex County Art & Heritage Council Gallery		Newton	Sussex	Skylands Region	Art	website
Thomas Alva Edison Memorial Tower and Museum		Menlo Park	Middlesex	Gateway Region	Technology	Also known as Menlo Park Museum, showcases many of the inventions of Thomas Edison
Thomas Edison National Historical Park		West Orange	Essex	Gateway Region	Technology, historic house	29 room Queen Ann-style mansion home of Thomas Edison and laboratory
Thomas Warne Museum		Old Bridge Township	Middlesex	Gateway Region	Local history	website Run by the Madison–Old Bridge Township Historical Society
Toms River Maritime Museum		Toms River	Ocean	Shore Region	Maritime	website, operated by the Toms River Seaport Society
Township of Hamilton Historical Society Museum		Mays Landing	Atlantic	South Jersey	Local history	website
Township of Lebanon Museum at New Hampton		New Hampton	Hunterdon	Skylands Region	School	website, 19th-century period schoolhouse
Township of Ocean Historical Museum		Oakhurst	Monmouth	Shore Region	Local history	website
Trailside Nature & Science Center		Mountainside	Union	Gateway Region	Natural history	Museum exhibits include mammals and birds of the Watchung Reservation, taxidermy and fluorescent minerals
Trenton City Museum at Ellarslie		Trenton	Mercer	Delaware River Region	Multiple	Located in the Ellarslie Mansion in Cadwalader Park, includes contemporary art, decorative arts, industrial memorabilia and area historical objects
Tuckerton Seaport		Tuckerton	Ocean	Shore Region	Maritime	Working maritime village with decoy carvers, boat builders, basket makers and baymen; formerly known as the Barnegat Bay Decoy and Baymen's Museum
United States Golf Association Museum		Far Hills	Somerset	Skylands Region	Sports	Golf memorabilia and artifacts
Updike Farmstead		Princeton	Mercer	Delaware River Region	Farm	website, operated by the Historical Society of Princeton
Van Harlingen Historical Society Farm Museum		Montgomery	Somerset	Skylands Region	Agriculture	
Van Liew-Suydam House		Somerset	Somerset	Skylands Region	Historic house	19th-century Victorian farmhouse, open for events, operated by the Meadows Foundation
Van Nest-Hoff-Vannatta Farmstead		Harmony Township	Warren	Skylands Region	Historic house	Operated by the Harmony Township Historical Society, historic farmstead buildings dating to the 18th century
Van Riper-Hopper Historic House Museum		Wayne	Passaic	Gateway Region	Historic house	Operated by the Wayne Township Parks and Recreation Department, 1876 Dutch colonial house, also location of Van Duyne House
Van Bunschooten Museum		Wantage	Sussex	Skylands Region	Historic house	Operated by the Chinkchewunska Chapter of the Daughters of the American Revolution, late 18th-century period house
Vernon Township Historical Society Museum		Highland Lakes	Sussex	Skylands Region	Local history	website
Vietnam Era Museum & Educational Center		Holmdel	Monmouth	Shore Region	History	History of the Vietnam war
Vineland Historical and Antiquarian Society Museum		Vineland	Cumberland	South Jersey	History	website, collections focus on 19th- and 20th-century regional history
Visual Arts Center of New Jersey		Summit	Union	Gateway Region	Art	website, includes 3 galleries and a sculpture park
Walker-Combs-Hartshorne Farmstead (Oakley Farm Museum)		Freehold Township	Monmouth	Shore Region	Historic house and community garden	website, Headquarters for the Freehold Township Heritage Society. It is the oldest farmstead in the state.
Wallace House		Somerville	Somerset	Skylands Region	Historic house	website, 1775 Georgian-style house adjacent to Old Dutch Parsonage, served as the headquarters of General George Washington during the second Middlebrook encampment (winter of 1778–79)
Walsh Gallery		South Orange	Essex	Gateway Region	Art	website, part of Seton Hall University
Walt Whitman House		Camden	Camden	Delaware River Region	Biographical	Home of poet Walt Whitman
Warren County Historical Society Museum		Belvidere	Warren	Skylands Region	Local history	website, period rooms, Warren County memorabilia, antiques, textiles and folk art
Washington Crossing State Park		Hopewell	Mercer	Delaware River Region	Multiple	Includes Washington Crossing Visitor Center Museum about the American Revolution, the Johnson Ferry House, a historic house museum, the Washington Crossing State Park Nature Center and an observatory
Washington Township Historical Society Museum		Long Valley	Morris	Skylands Region	Local history	website
Waterloo Village		Stanhope	Sussex	Skylands Region	Transportation	website, Canal Society of New Jersey headquarters and museum, Morris Canal, National Registered Historic Site in Allamuchy Mountain State Park
West Milford Museum		West Milford	Passaic	Gateway Region	Local history	website
Weston Museum		Newark	Essex	Gateway Region	Science	Contains items developed and manufactured by inventor Edward Weston
Westwood Museum		Westwood	Bergen	Gateway Region	Local history	website, operated by the Westwood Heritage Society; located in the Westwood Train Station
The Wetlands Institute		Stone Harbor	Cape May	South Jersey	Natural history	Birds, animals and ecosystem of the surrounding wetlands
WheatonArts		Millville	Cumberland	South Jersey	Art	Houses Museum of Glass
Whippany Railway Museum		Whippany	Morris	Skylands Region	Transportation - Railroad	Railroad cars and memorabilia
Wicoff House Museum		Plainsboro	Middlesex	Gateway Region	Local history	website
William Trent House		Trenton	Mercer	Delaware River Region	Historic house	1719 house built for founder of Trenton, has served several times as the Governor's House
Woodruff Museum of Indian Artifacts		Bridgeton	Cumberland	South Jersey	Native American	website, over 20,000 artifacts related to the Lenni-Lenape Tribe, located in the Bridgeton Free Public Library
Wortendyke Barn Museum		Park Ridge	Bergen	Gateway Region	Agriculture	Old-world Dutch barn and farm exhibits
Yogi Berra Museum and Learning Center		Little Falls	Passaic	Gateway Region	Sports	Permanent and rotating exhibits about baseball, Yankee history, and Yogi Berra, located on the campus of Montclair State University
Zimmerli Art Museum		New Brunswick	Middlesex	Gateway Region	Art	Part of Rutgers University, strengths in Russian and Soviet art, French 19th-century and American 19th- and 20th-century art, contemporary prints

== Defunct museums ==
- Army Communications, Radar, and Electronics Museum, Fort Monmouth, closed in 2010, collections moved to the United States Army Ordnance Museum at Aberdeen Proving Ground in Maryland
- Asbury Park Rock 'N Roll Museum, Asbury Park, closed in 2004
- Charles and Anna Hankins Museum, Lavallette, building sold in 2008 and displays moved to Toms River Seaport Society Maritime Museum
- Community Children's Museum, Dover, closed in 2012
- Flemington Children's Choir School, Flemington
- Jack Allen Memorial Country Living Museum, Southampton, closed in 2020
- Johnston Historical Museum, North Brunswick, closed in 1979
- Metz Bicycle Museum, Freehold, website, closed in 2013
- Museum of Natural History at Princeton University, Guyot Hall, Princeton, closed in 2000
- New Jersey Museum of Agriculture, North Brunswick, closed in 2011
- North Pemberton Railroad Station Museum, Pemberton
- Shore Institute for Contemporary Art, Long Branch
- Solitude House Museum (High Bridge)
- South Jersey Railroad Museum, Tuckahoe
- United States Bicycling Hall of Fame, Bridgewater, moved to California in 2010
- Waterhouse Museum, Toms River
- Wonder Museum, East Windsor

== See also ==
- List of museums
- List of historical societies in New Jersey
- Nature Centers in New Jersey
- List of zoos in the United States#New Jersey
- List of aquaria in the United States#New Jersey
