= Pilgrim II =

Pilgrim II may refer to:

- USS Pilgrim II (YFB-30), a United States Navy motor launch employed as a river patrol boat during her naval service from 1942 to 1947
- Peace Pilgrim II, Ronald Leonard Podrow (May 16, 1926 – December 19, 2004), an American pacifist
- Pellegrino II of Aquileia (died 1204), a patriarch of Aquileia in northern Italy
- Pilgrim von Puchheim (died 1396), archbishop of Salzburg as Pilgrim II
- Pilgrim II, bronze medal-winning horse in team jumping at the 2007 FEI European Jumping Championship
