= Peace Pilgrim =

American peace activist, spiritual teacher

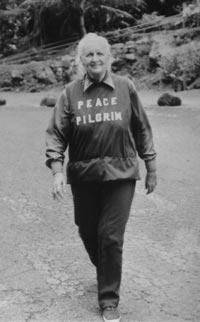
- Pilgrim in Hawaii, 1980
- Born: Mildred Lisette Norman; July 18, 1908; Egg Harbor City, New Jersey, U.S.
- Died: July 7, 1981 (aged 72); Knox, Indiana, U.S.
- Website: www.peacepilgrim.org

Peace Pilgrim (July 18, 1908 – July 7, 1981), born Mildred Lisette Norman, was an American spiritual teacher, mystic, pacifist, vegetarian activist and peace activist. In 1952, she became the first woman to walk the entire length of the Appalachian Trail in one season. Starting on January 1, 1953, in Pasadena, California, she adopted the name "Peace Pilgrim" and walked across the United States for 28 years, speaking with others about peace. She was on her seventh cross-country journey when she died.

A transcript of a 1964 conversation with Peace Pilgrim from a broadcast on KPFK radio in Los Angeles was published as "Steps Toward Inner Peace". She stopped counting miles in that year, having walked more than 25,000 mi (40,000 km) for peace.

== Early life ==
Mildred Lisette Norman was born on a poultry farm in Egg Harbor City, New Jersey, in 1908, the oldest of three children. Her mother, Josephine Marie Ranch, was a tailor, and her father, Ernest Norman, a carpenter. Although poor, the Norman family was admired in a community of German immigrants, whose relatives originally settled the area after escaping Germany in 1855.

In 1933 she eloped with Stanley Ryder and moved to Philadelphia in 1939. They divorced in 1946. She became a vegetarian for ethical reasons, stating that she could not kill any living creature. She believed that meat eating was poisonous to the body and lived on a diet of fruits, nuts, vegetables, wholegrains and dairy products.

In 1952, she became the first woman to thru-hike the Appalachian Trail.

== Pilgrimage ==
In order for the world to become peaceful, people must become more peaceful. Among mature people war would not be a problem – it would be impossible. In their immaturity people want, at the same time, peace and the things which make war. However, people can mature just as children grow up. Yes, our institutions and our leaders reflect our immaturity, but as we mature we will elect better leaders and set up better institutions. It always comes back to the thing so many of us wish to avoid: working to improve ourselves.

— Peace Pilgrim

In the book, "Peace Pilgrim: Her Life and Work in Her Own Words," she related that her physical journey began after having experienced a "spiritual awakening," following a long period of meditation practice. She said that this awakening was a direct, mystical experience of the "creator's" love. She claimed that this spurred her to then start her decades-long walking journey for peace.

Her pilgrimage spanned almost three decades beginning January 1, 1953, in Pasadena, California. The Korean War was in progress. She continued walking for 28 years, spanning the American involvement in the Vietnam War and beyond. Peace Pilgrim was a frequent speaker at churches, universities, and local and national radio and television.

Expressing her ideas about peace, she referred to herself only as "Peace Pilgrim." Peace Pilgrim's only possessions were the clothes on her back and the few items she carried in the pockets of her blue tunic which read "Peace Pilgrim" on the front and "25,000 miles on foot for peace" on the back. She had no organizational backing, carried no money, and would not even ask for food or shelter. When she began her pilgrimage she had taken a vow to "remain a wanderer until mankind has learned the way of peace, walking until given shelter and fasting until given food."

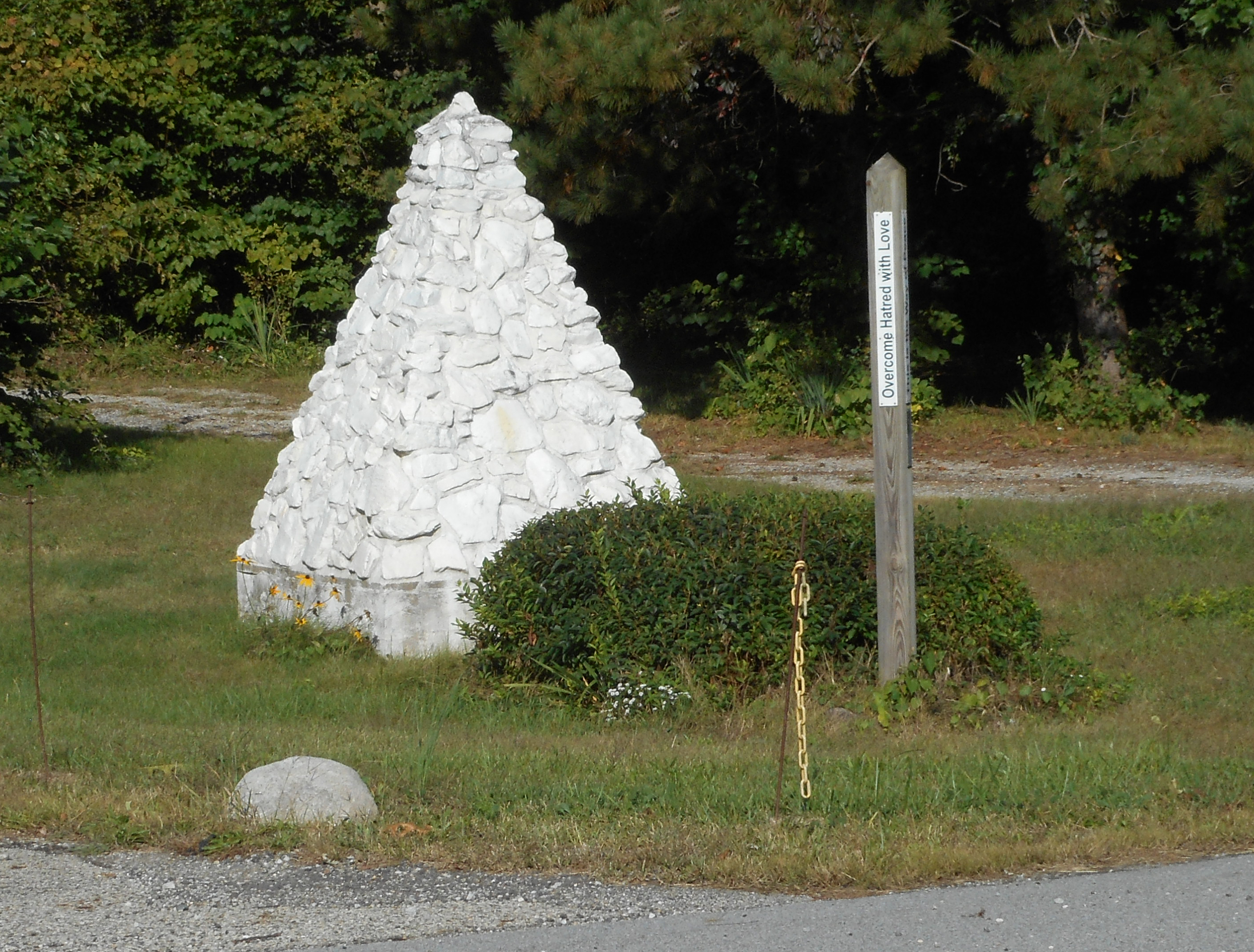
Peace Pilgrim Memorial at the site of her fatal automobile accident.

On July 7, 1981, while being driven to a speaking engagement near Knox, Indiana, Peace Pilgrim was killed in an automobile accident. The accident occurred on Indiana State Road 23, around 330 feet (100 m) south of the bridge crossing Eagle Creek about 1.6 miles (2.6 km) north of Indiana State Road 23's intersection with Indiana State Road 8. A marker is in the front lawn on the west side of the highway. At the time of her death, she was crossing the United States for the seventh time. After her death, her body was cremated, and her ashes were interred in a family plot near Egg Harbor City, New Jersey.

== Legacy ==
Friends of Peace Pilgrim is an all-volunteer non-profit organization dedicated to making information about the life and message of Peace Pilgrim available freely to all who ask. Since 1983 they have published and distributed over 400,000 copies of the book, Peace Pilgrim: Her Life and Work in Her Own Words, and over 1.5 million copies of the booklet, Steps Toward Inner Peace. Books and booklets have been sent to over 100 countries. The book has been translated into 12 languages and the booklet into over 20 languages.

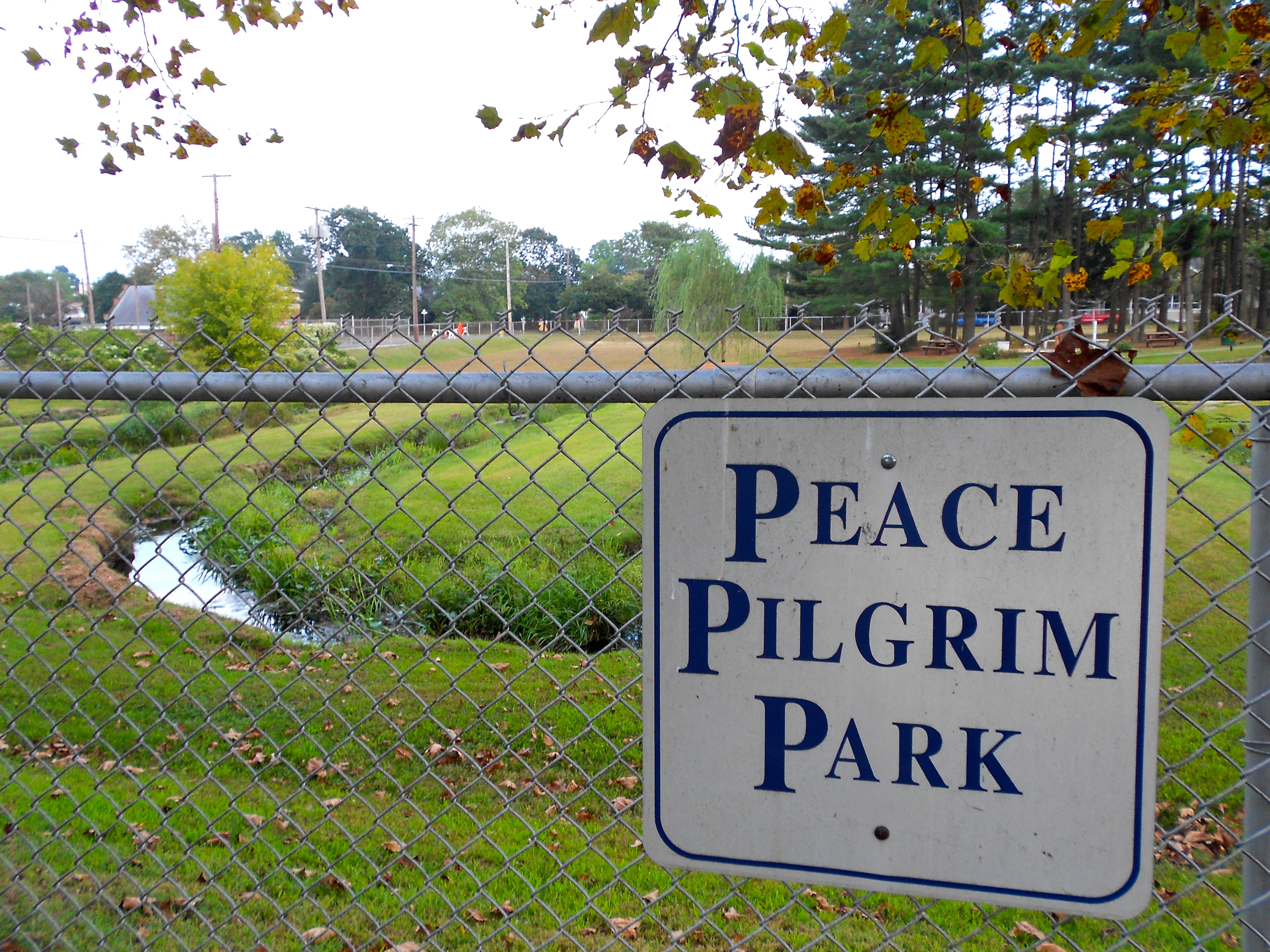
Peace Pilgrim Park in Egg Harbor City, New Jersey

In 2005 Peace Pilgrim Park was created in her hometown of Egg Harbor City, New Jersey on part of the site of the former Neutral Water Health Resort Sanitarium. Since 2007 an annual Peace Pilgrim Celebration has been observed in the park and at sites throughout Egg Harbor City on September 20–22.

In 2017 she was inducted into the New Jersey Hall of Fame. The same year, she was inducted into the Appalachian Trail Hall of Fame.

== Awards ==
- Peace Abbey Courage of Conscience Award
- Inducted into the New Jersey Hall of Fame (2016)
- Appalachian Trail Hall of Fame (2017)

== Publications ==
- Steps Toward Inner Peace. Santa Fe, NM: Ocean Tree Books. 1993 [1964]. ISBN 978-0-94373-424-8. OCLC 26257376, 1479979821.
- Friends of Peace Pilgrim, ed. (2013) [1982]. Peace Pilgrim: Her Life and Work in Her Own Words. Ocean Tree Books. ISBN 978-0-94373-429-3. OCLC 23090371.
- Peace Pilgrim: The Spirit of Peace. 1997.

== Documentaries ==
- Peace Pilgrim, Hemet, Calif.: Friends of Peace Pilgrim, 2002, OCLC 50038811, 61390623
- Peace Pilgrim documentaries, Hemet, Calif.: Friends of Peace Pilgrim, 1995 [1994], OCLC 497810322, 30420600

== See also ==
- Granny D
- List of peace activists
- List of people who have walked across the United States
- Ronald Podrow
