= Afro-American Historical and Cultural Society Museum =

Museum in Jersey City, New Jersey

Coordinates: 40°42′11″N 74°5′29″W

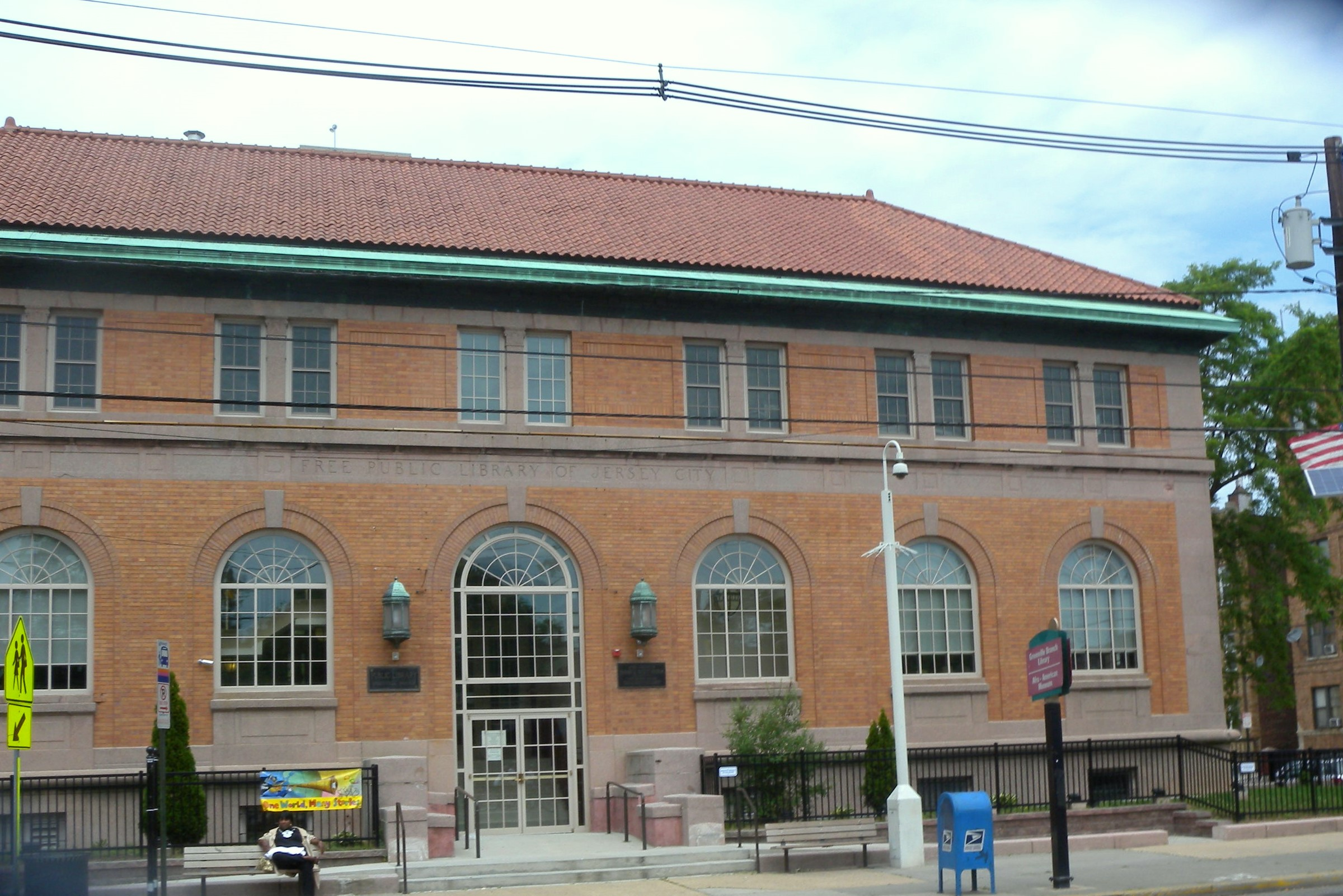
Library and Museum

The Afro-American Historical and Cultural Society Museum is located is on the upper floor of the Greenville Branch of the Jersey City, New Jersey Public Library, its collection is dedicated to the African American experience.

The museum has galleries for lectures, special exhibits, and a permanent collection of material culture of New Jersey's African Americans as well as African artifacts. The collection includes books, newspapers, documents, photographs and memorabilia regarding African American history and information about the slave trade in New Jersey, the underground railroad, a replica of an urban 1930s kitchen, the Pullman Porters (a black labor union), the Civil Rights Movement, the NAACP in New Jersey, New Jersey"s historic African American churches, and genealogical records.

The heritage of Jersey City's African American community has been collected and preserved in a special collection, including the city's earliest black residents (in the 17th century Bergen, New Netherland settlement), its role in the Underground Railroad, and the civil rights movement, including Martin Luther King Jr.'s appearances.

== History ==
Begun as a grass-roots committee in the 1970s, the Afro-American Historical Society was formed by Captain Thomas Taylor (president of the Jersey City branch of the National Association for the Advancement of Colored People), Theodore Brunson, (lay historian in Afro-American history), Mrs. Nora Fant (long time activist and resident of Jersey City), and Mrs. Virginia Dunnaway (community worker and teacher). It later became a non-profit organization. In 1984, the Afro-American Historical Society Museum obtained its current home, granted by the trustees of the library. During his term, Glenn Dale Cunningham, the only African American mayor of Jersey City, brought attention to the work and collection of the small museum.

== See also ==
- Exhibitions in Hudson County
- List of museums focused on African Americans
- List of museums in New Jersey
