= Turner–Chew–Carhart Farm =

Historic house in New Jersey, United States

- U.S. National Register of Historic Places
- New Jersey Register of Historic Places
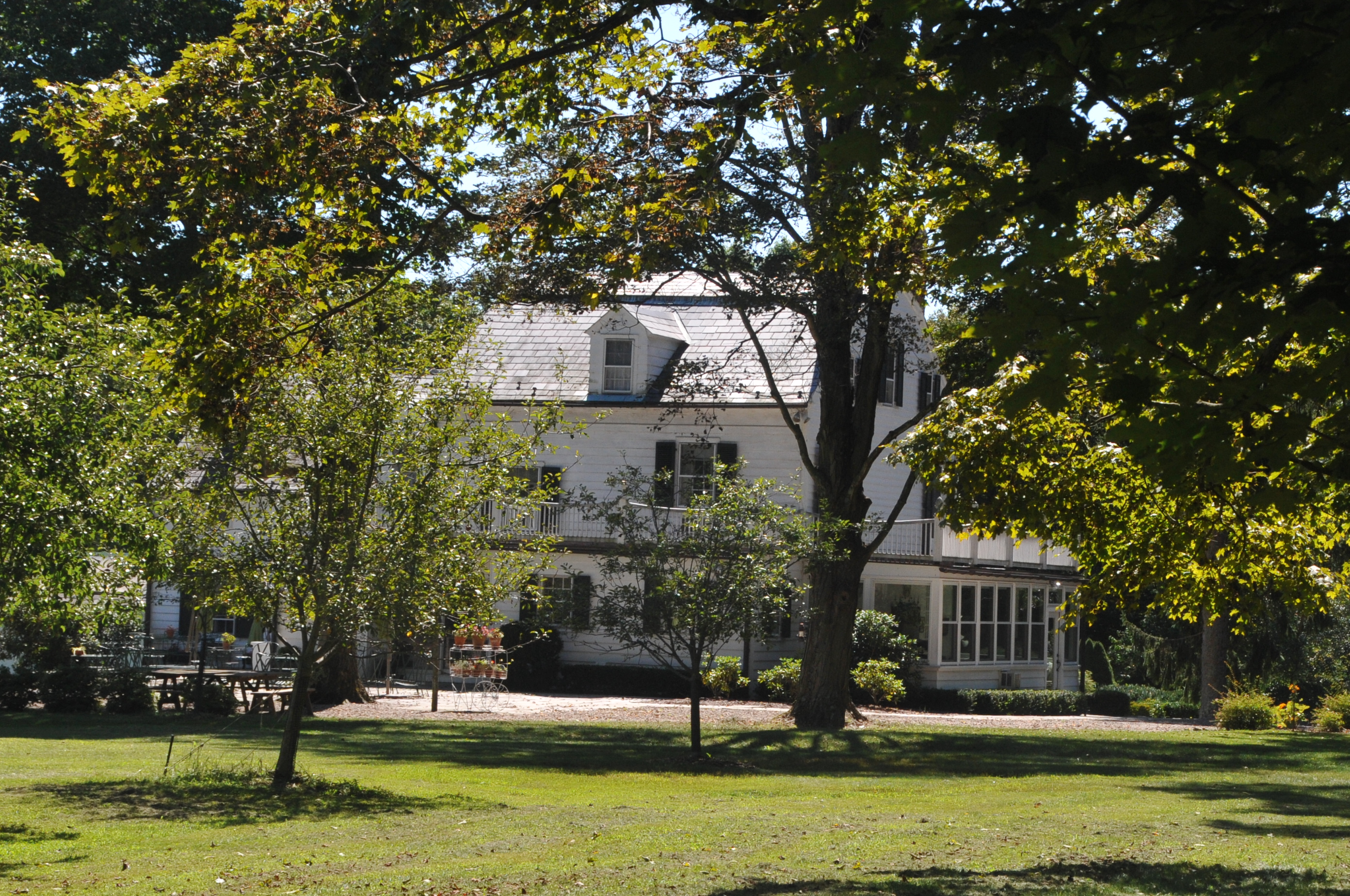
- Main Farmhouse

- Location within Hunterdon County, New Jersey Location within New Jersey Location within the United States
- Location: 113 Van Syckles Road; Union Township, Hunterdon County, New Jersey
- Nearest city: Clinton, New Jersey
- Coordinates: 40°39′12″N 74°57′27″W
- Area: 57 acres (23 ha)
- Architectural style: Greek Revival
- NRHP reference No.: 77000875
- NJRHP No.: 1639

Significant dates
- Added to NRHP: August 11, 1977
- Designated NJRHP: April 25, 1977

The Turner–Chew–Carhart Farm, also known as the Jockey Hollow Farm, is a historic 57-acre (23 ha) farm located off Van Syckles Road in Union Township, Hunterdon County, New Jersey and near Clinton. It was added to the National Register of Historic Places on August 11, 1977, for its significance in agriculture, architecture, industry, and politics/government. The farmstead includes seven contributing buildings.

== History ==
Joseph Turner (1701–1783) and William Allen (1704–1780), both from Philadelphia, built two iron forges in the area during the 1740s. The house was built for the nearby Union Forge and was intended as the residence for its superintendent. In 1784, Turner's niece, Elizabeth Oswald Chew, second wife of Benjamin Chew (1722–1810), inherited the farm. In 1833, Charles Carhart (1786–1863) purchased it from Samuel Chew.

== Description ==
The early 19th century farmhouse is a two and one-half story frame building with a gambrel roof attached to an 18th-century one and one-half story frame building. It shows a restrained Greek Revival style, such as the sidelights and transom for the front door. There is a dormer in the gambrel roof. The original 18th-century building was likely altered and expanded c. 1833 by Carhart.

== Museum ==
In 2012, the Union Forge Heritage Association established the Solitude Heritage Museum in the farmhouse at 117 Van Syckles Road, named the 1760 Joseph Turner House.

The Forge Masters house for the Union Forge is also located nearby, off Van Syckles Road toward High Bridge.

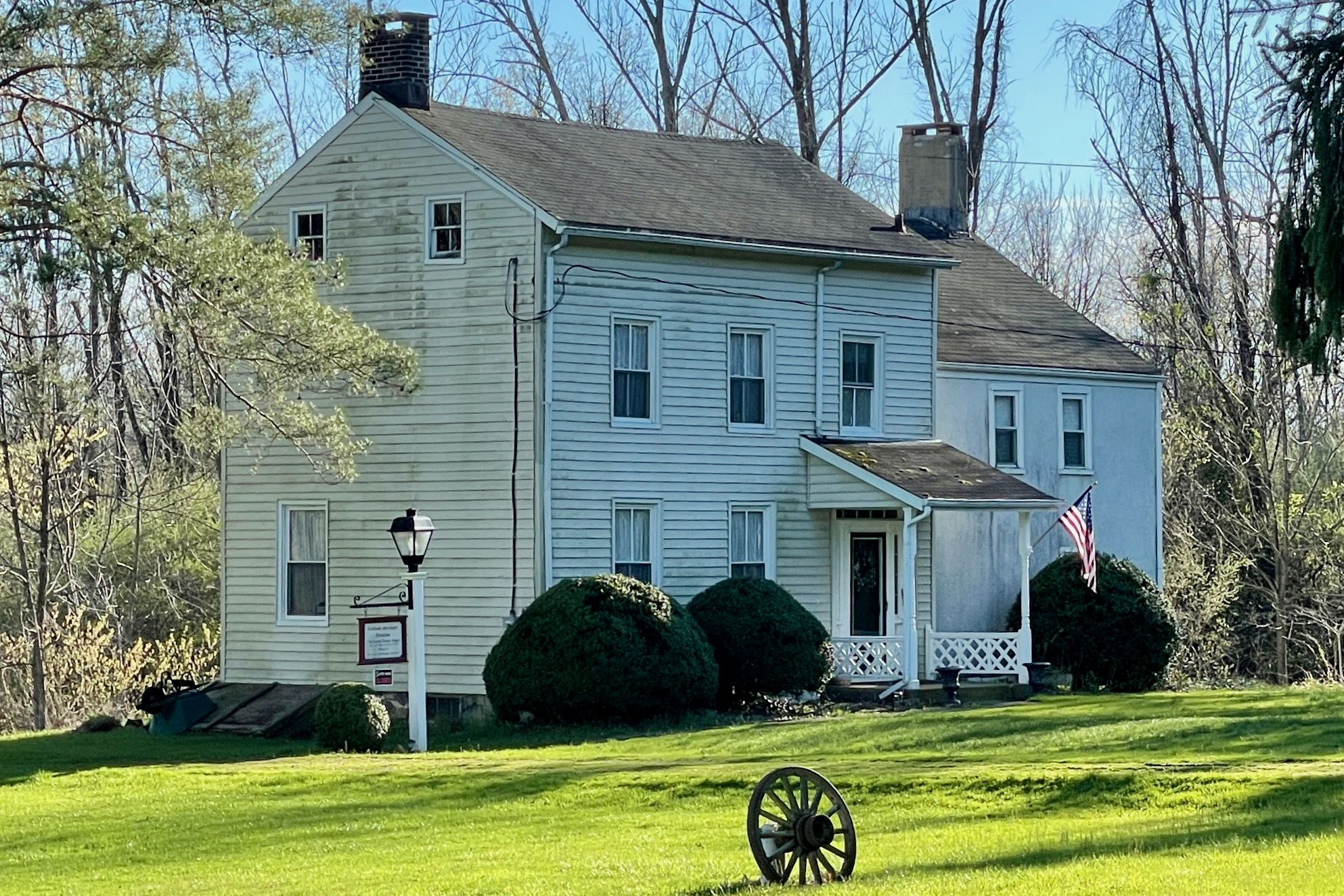
Solitude Heritage Museum

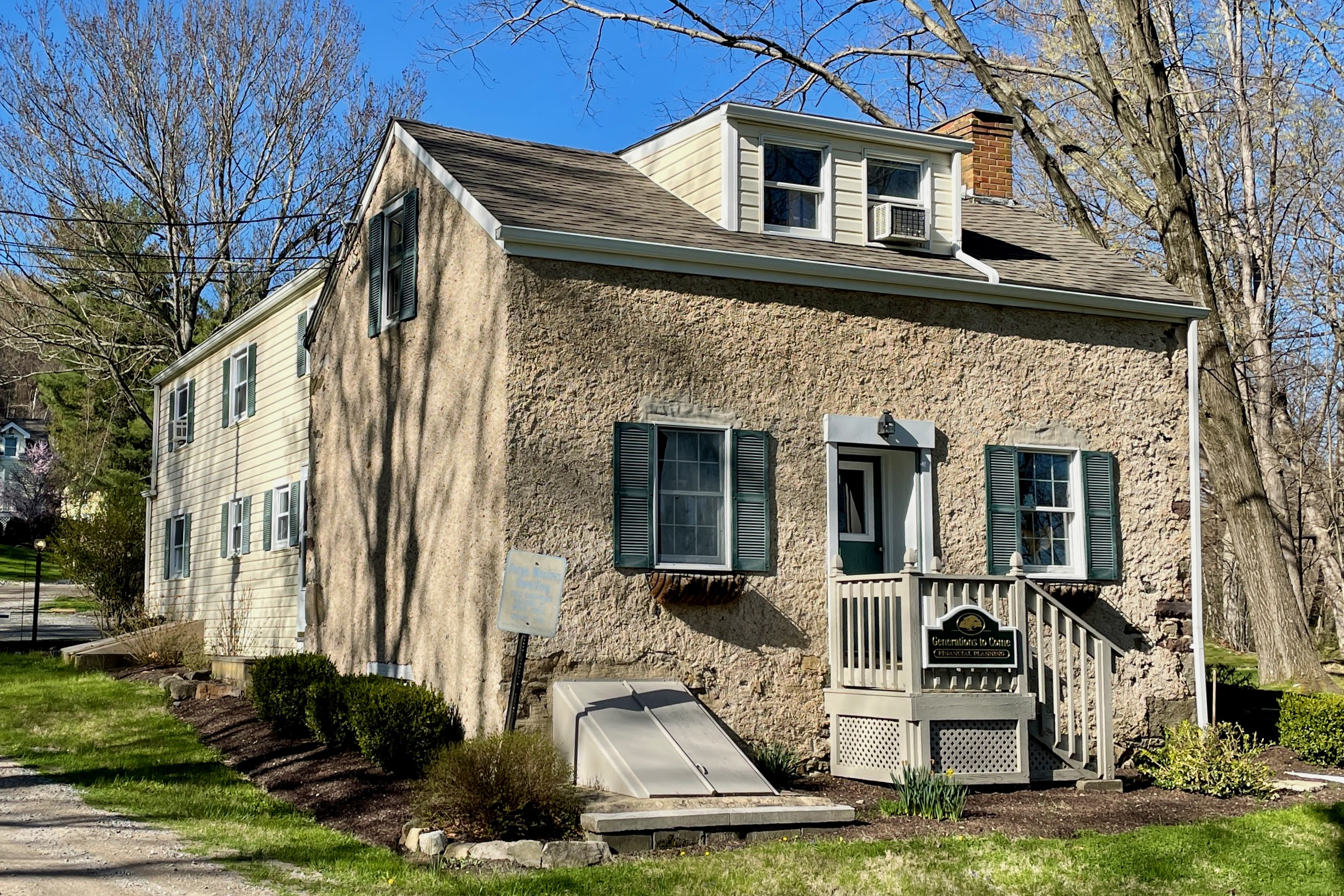
Forge Masters house

== See also ==
- National Register of Historic Places listings in Hunterdon County, New Jersey
- List of museums in New Jersey
