= Cedar Grove School (Old Bridge Township, New Jersey) =

- U.S. National Register of Historic Places
- New Jersey Register of Historic Places
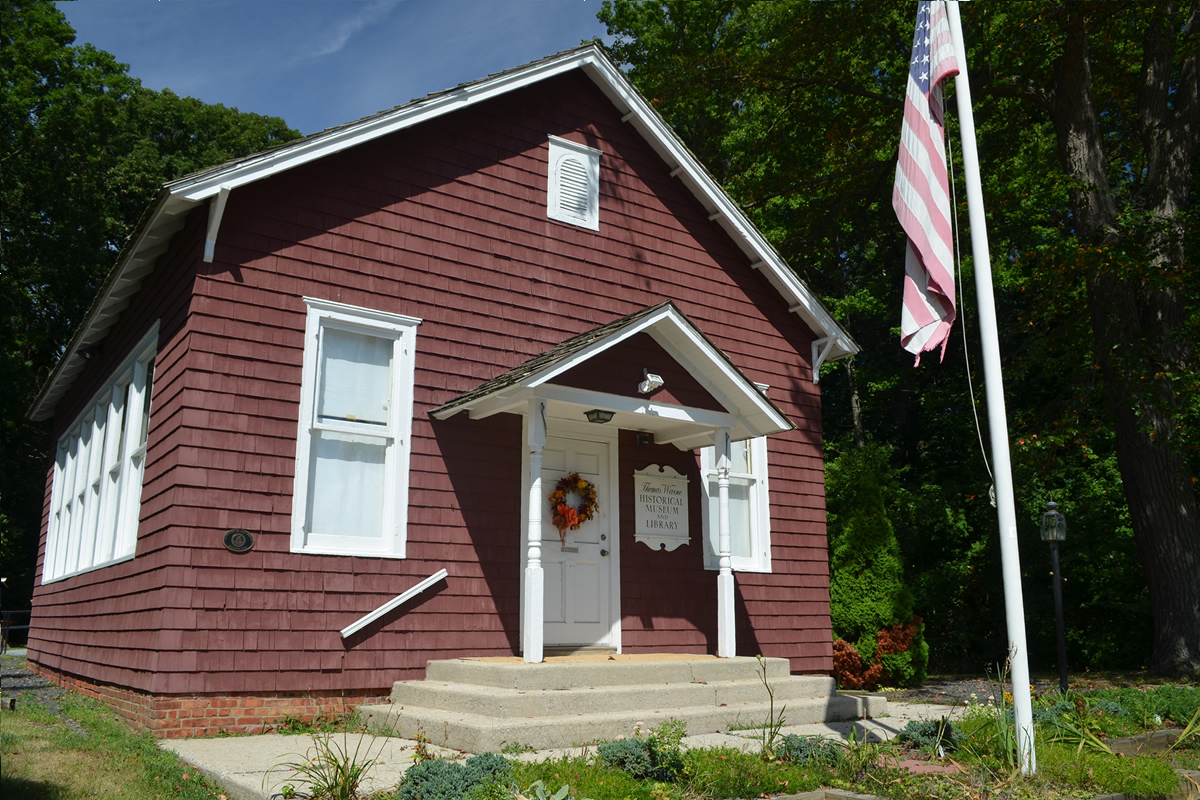

- Location within Middlesex County, New Jersey Location within New Jersey Location within the United States
- Location: 4216 County Route 516; Old Bridge Township, New Jersey
- Coordinates: 40°24′29″N 74°16′15″W
- Area: 1 acre (0.40 ha)
- Built: 1885
- NRHP reference No.: 76001165
- NJRHP No.: 1886

Significant dates
- Added to NRHP: October 24, 1976
- Designated NJRHP: July 1, 1974

The Cedar Grove School is a historic one-room schoolhouse located at 4216 County Route 516 in Old Bridge Township of Middlesex County, New Jersey, United States. Built in 1885, it was added to the National Register of Historic Places on October 24, 1976 for its significance in education and community history. It was named after the nearby cedar trees and cedar swamp. Since 1964, the building has been the Thomas Warne Museum, run by the Madison–Old Bridge Township Historical Society.

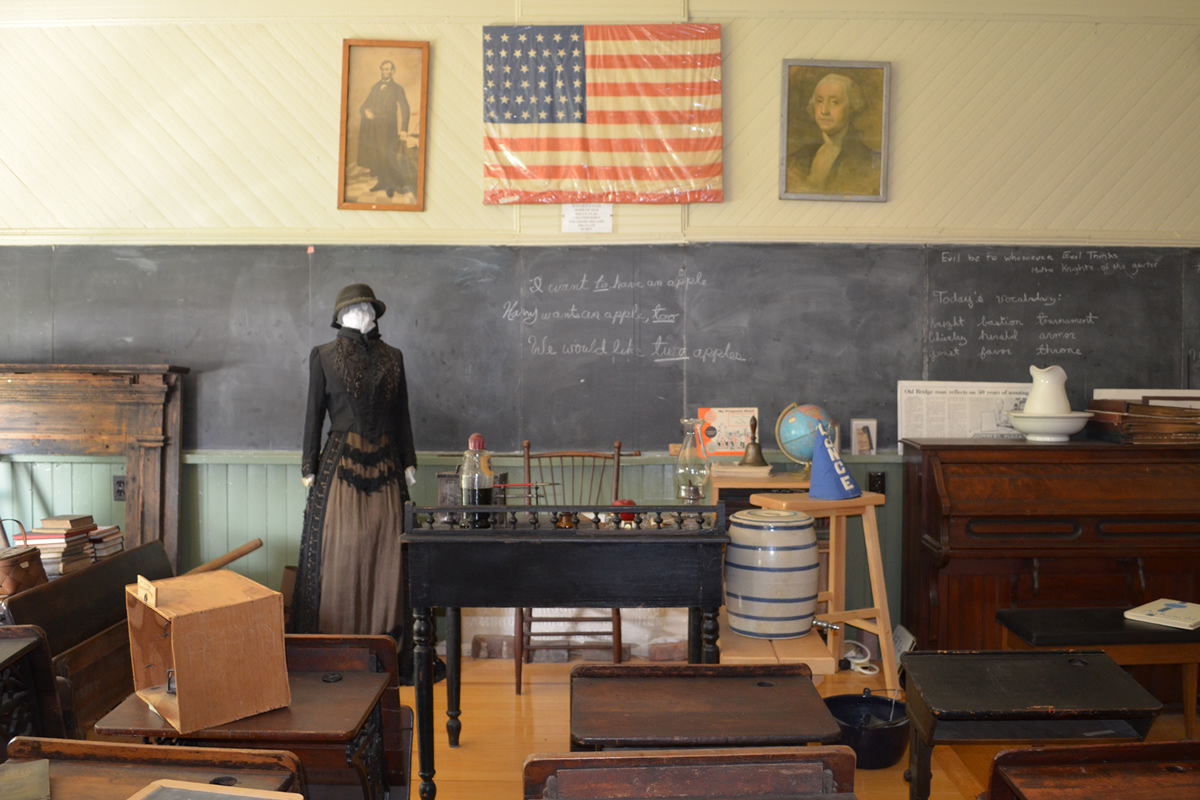
View of the schoolhouse interior

== See also ==
- National Register of Historic Places listings in Middlesex County, New Jersey
- List of museums in New Jersey
