= Shore Region =

Region of New Jersey

Coordinates: 39.945°N 74.078°W

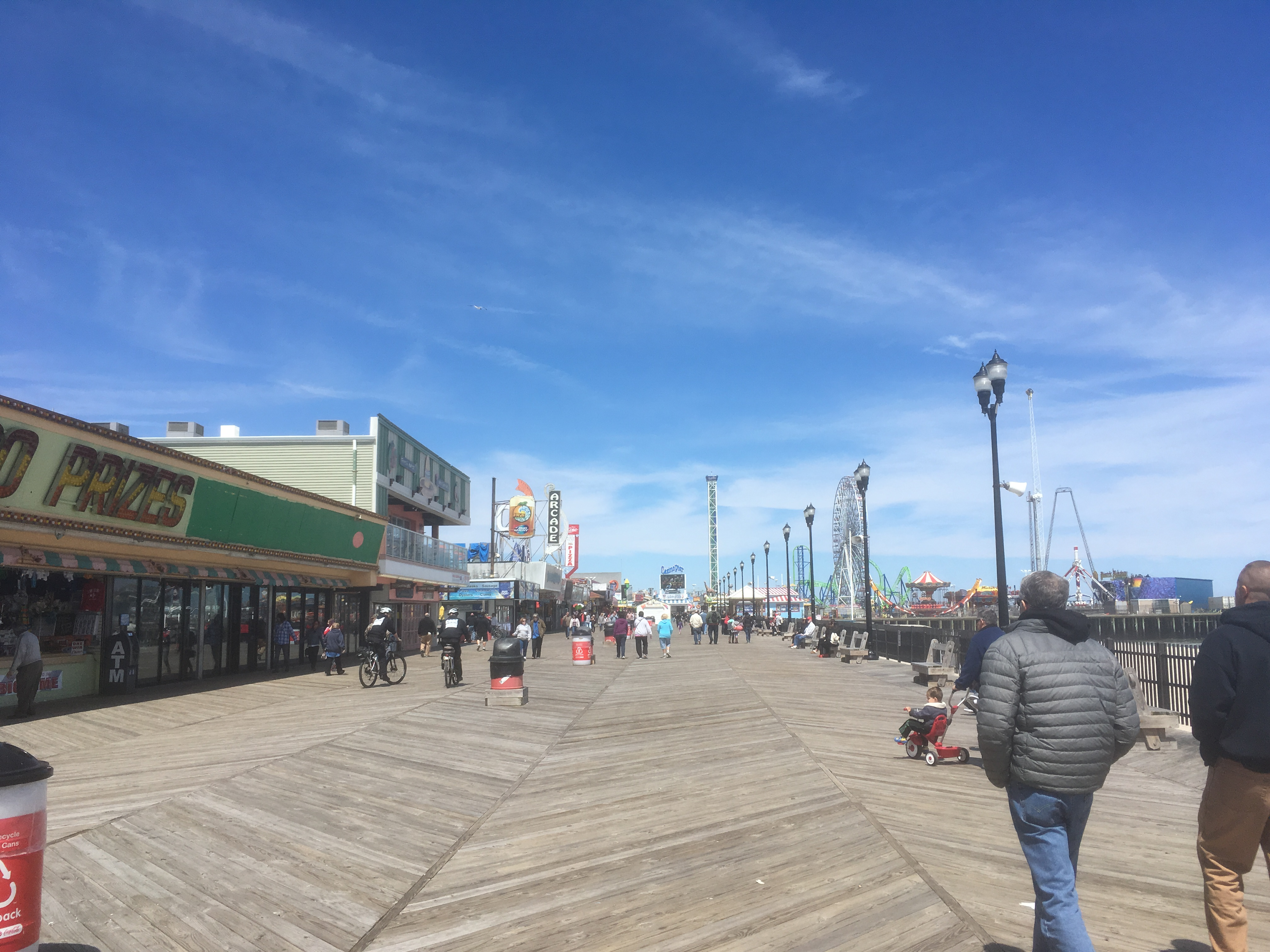
Seaside Heights boardwalk looking towards the Casino Pier

The Shore Region of the state of New Jersey encompasses Monmouth and Ocean Counties, and is part of the Jersey Shore. Traditionally a leader in tourism, the region holds 15% of the state's tourism, ranking 3rd in New Jersey. Since both counties have long stretches of beach, most tourism money is generated from the near shore areas of this region. It is one of seven officially recognized tourism regions, the others being the Greater Atlantic City Region, the Southern Shore Region, the Delaware River Region, the Skylands Region, Central Jersey Region, and the Gateway Region.

== Geography ==
Much of the land is flat and coastal, maintaining a height of less than 250 feet (76 meters) across the entire stretch of both counties. There are, however, a few exceptions, including Mount Mitchill in Atlantic Highlands, New Jersey. Mount Mitchill reaches a height of 266 feet (81 meters), making it the highest headland on the eastern U.S. coast, south of Maine. It has a panoramic view of the Raritan Bay, New York City and Sandy Hook. It is near the Twin Lights Lighthouse in Highlands, NJ, and is the location of the Monmouth County 9-11 Memorial. It was named after Samuel Latham Mitchill, who determined the height of the hill, near Locust. At the northeastern tip, a sand spit called Sandy Hook is part of the Gateway National Recreation Area. Continuing south on this stretch of shore, there are famous beaches such as Deal, Long Branch, and Sea Bright. The northern edge of the region runs alongside Lower New York Bay.

In Ocean County, long stretches of barrier islands make major harbors impractical, but the area has drawn much attention for its many sailing programs.

== Economy ==
The largest source of income in the region is the tourism industry, which accounts for 85% of employment. It is a vital source of income for many families and businesses. Employment growth exceeds the state average; however, housing development is relatively limited. In contrast, the northern coastal region relies primarily on industrial jobs. This area accounts for approximately 57% of the state's total employment, but its employment growth is lower than the state average.

== Demographics ==
As of the census of 2000, there were 1,126,207 people, 424,638 households, 298, 194 families, with a population density of 406.5/km^{2}. The Shore Region is 88% White, 5% African American, 3% Asian, .02% Pacific Islander, 1.5% Other; 6% of the peoples where Hispanic/Latino regardless of descent.

== Tourism ==
The region contains activities for tourists including fishing, boating, shopping and numerous beaches. The Shore Institute for Contemporary Art was a non-profit arts center in Asbury Park, New Jersey, which closed in 2012.

- National Register of Historic Places listings in Monmouth County, New Jersey
- National Register of Historic Places listings in Ocean County, New Jersey
