= John Holmes House =

Historic house in New Jersey, United States

- Cresse-Holmes House Historic District
- U.S. National Register of Historic Places
- U.S. Historic district
- New Jersey Register of Historic Places
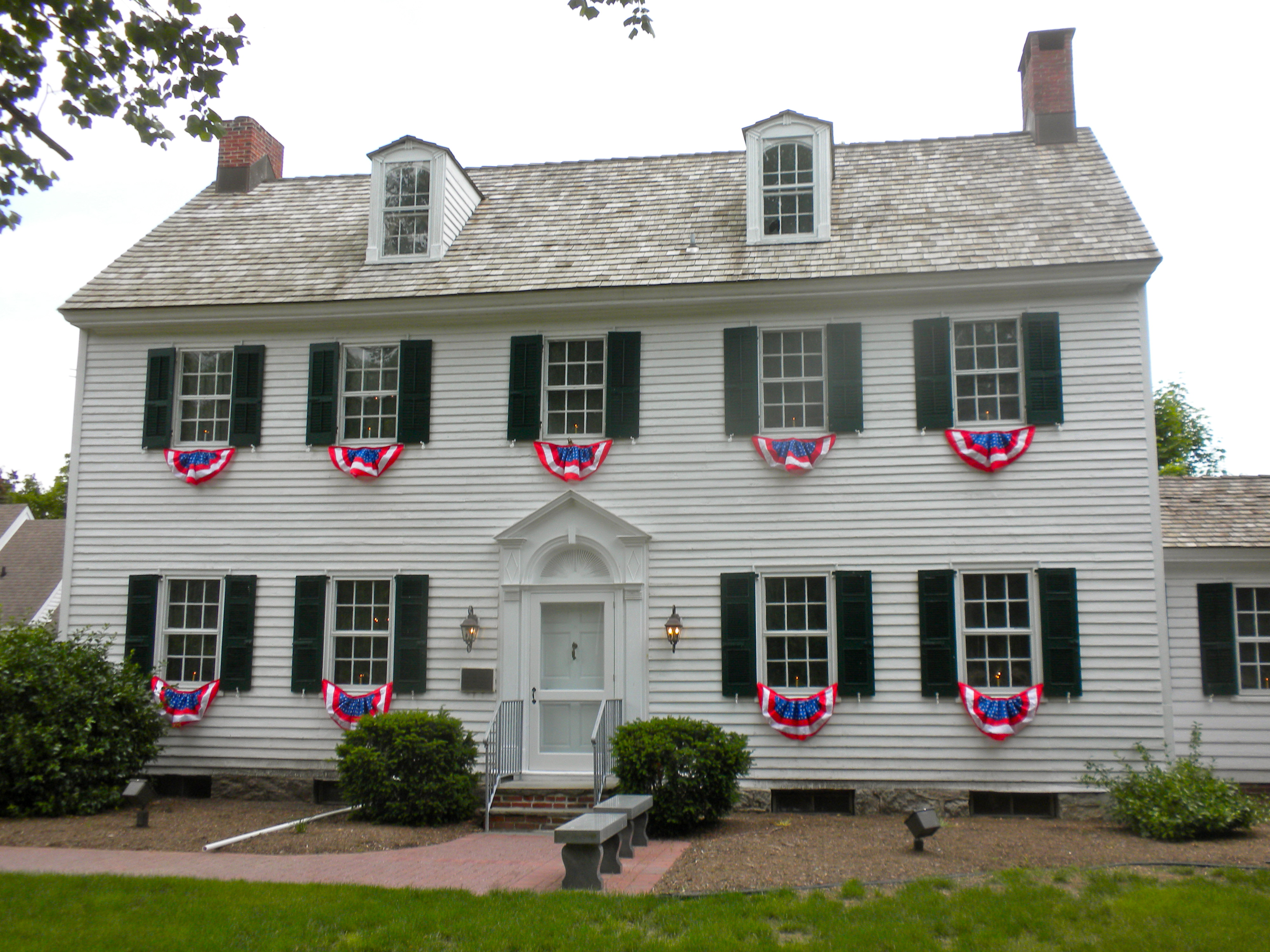
- John Holmes House in 2010.

- Location within Cape May County, New Jersey Location within New Jersey Location within the United States
- Location: 504 N. U.S. 9, Cape May Court House, Middle Township, New Jersey
- Coordinates: 39°5′46″N 74°48′48″W
- Area: 2.5 acres (1.0 ha)
- Built: 1704 & 1830
- Architectural style: Vernacular Georgian
- NRHP reference No.: 79001481 (original); 100011491 (increase)
- NJRHP No.: 1004

Significant dates
- Added to NRHP: June 12, 1979
- Boundary increase: March 7, 2025
- Designated NJRHP: March 29, 1979

John Holmes House, also known as the Cresse–Holmes House, is located at 504 U.S. Route 9 North in the Cape May Court House section of Middle Township in Cape May County, New Jersey. It was added to the National Register of Historic Places on June 12, 1979, for its significance in vernacular Georgian architecture. It was documented by the Historic American Buildings Survey in 1992.

== History ==
The house was originally thought to have been built in 1755 by Robert Cresse. Later research has shown that the oldest part of the house was built c. 1704 by John Cresse, his father. The "newer" portion of the house was built by Robert Morris Holmes, son of John Holmes, in 1830. The house has been owned by the Cape May County Historical and Genealogical Society since 1976.

== Museum ==
The house is now operated as the Museum of Cape May County, and features an 18th-century period kitchen, bedroom and 1830 dining room and a Victorian sitting room. Other exhibits include a doctor's room, a military room, Native American room and maritime artifacts.

== See also ==
- National Register of Historic Places listings in Cape May County, New Jersey
- List of museums in New Jersey
