= Old Ryan Farm =

- U.S. National Register of Historic Places
- New Jersey Register of Historic Places
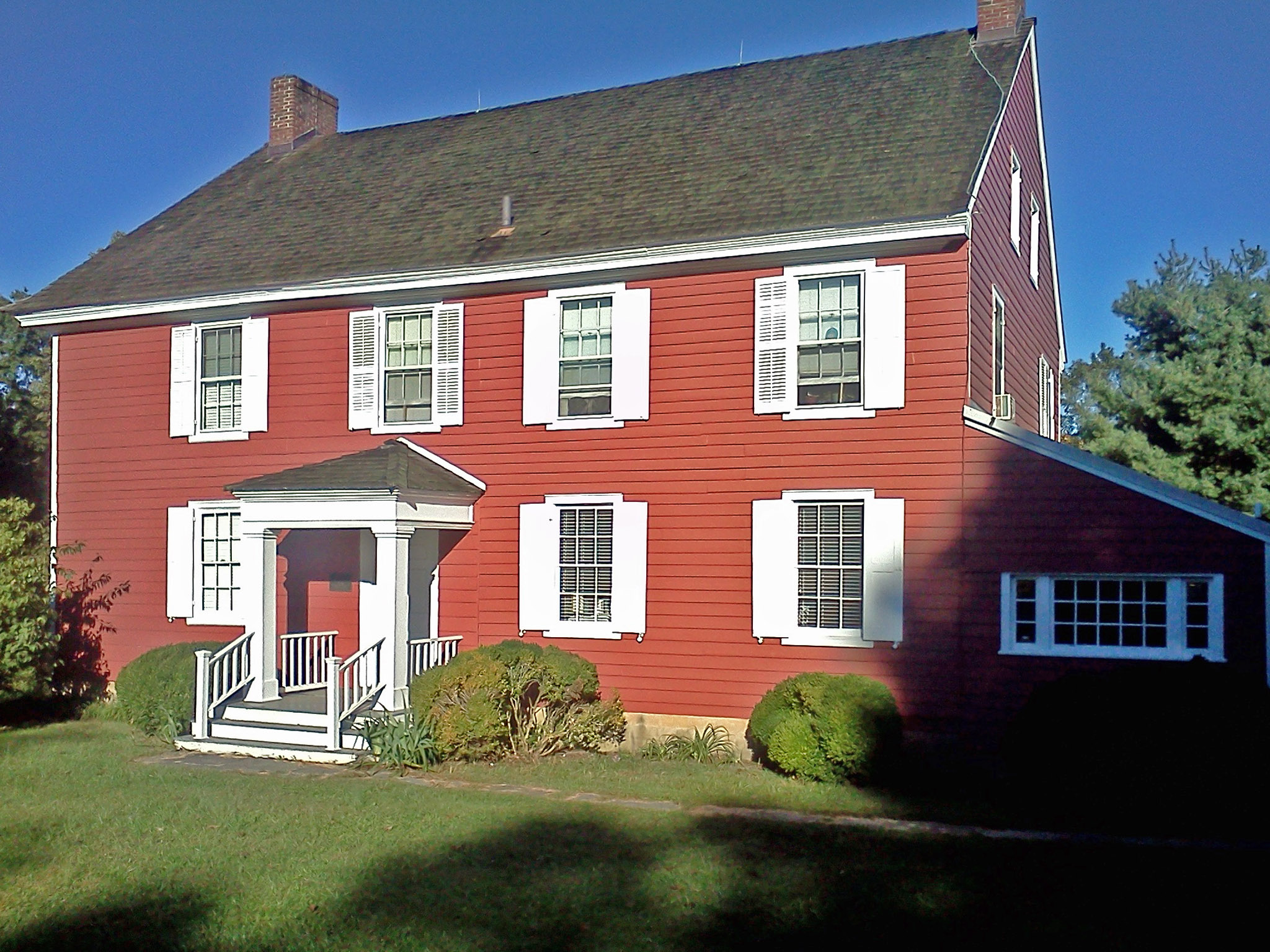
- Benjamin Temple House in 2012

- Location within Mercer County, New Jersey Location within New Jersey Location within the United States
- Location: 27 Federal City Road, Ewing Township, New Jersey
- Coordinates: 40°16′46″N 74°46′15″W
- Area: 6 acres (2.4 ha)
- Built: c. 1750
- NRHP reference No.: 71000507
- NJRHP No.: 1646

Significant dates
- Added to NRHP: September 10, 1971
- Designated NJRHP: May 6, 1971

The Old Ryan Farm, also known as the Benjamin Temple House and the Temple–Ryan Farmhouse, is a historic house built c. 1750 and located at 27 Federal City Road in the Ewingville section of Ewing Township in Mercer County, New Jersey, United States. It was added to the National Register of Historic Places on September 10, 1971, for its significance in agriculture and architecture. The house was moved from its original location on Pennington Road (New Jersey Route 31) in May 1973. The Benjamin Temple House is now operated as a historic house museum by the Ewing Township Historic Preservation Society.

== History and description ==
The frame house was built c. 1750 by local farmer Benjamin Temple. He was a brother-in-law of John Hart, a signer of the Declaration of Independence. The house was expanded c. 1840 to two and one-half stories. The Temple family lived here until 1903, when Cornelia Temple died and the house was sold to Patrick Ryan. The Ryan family operated a dairy on the farm for fifty years.

== See also ==
- National Register of Historic Places listings in Mercer County, New Jersey
- List of the oldest buildings in New Jersey
- List of museums in New Jersey
