= Neutral Water Health Resort Sanitarium =

Historic medical site in New Jersey, US

- U.S. National Register of Historic Places
- New Jersey Register of Historic Places
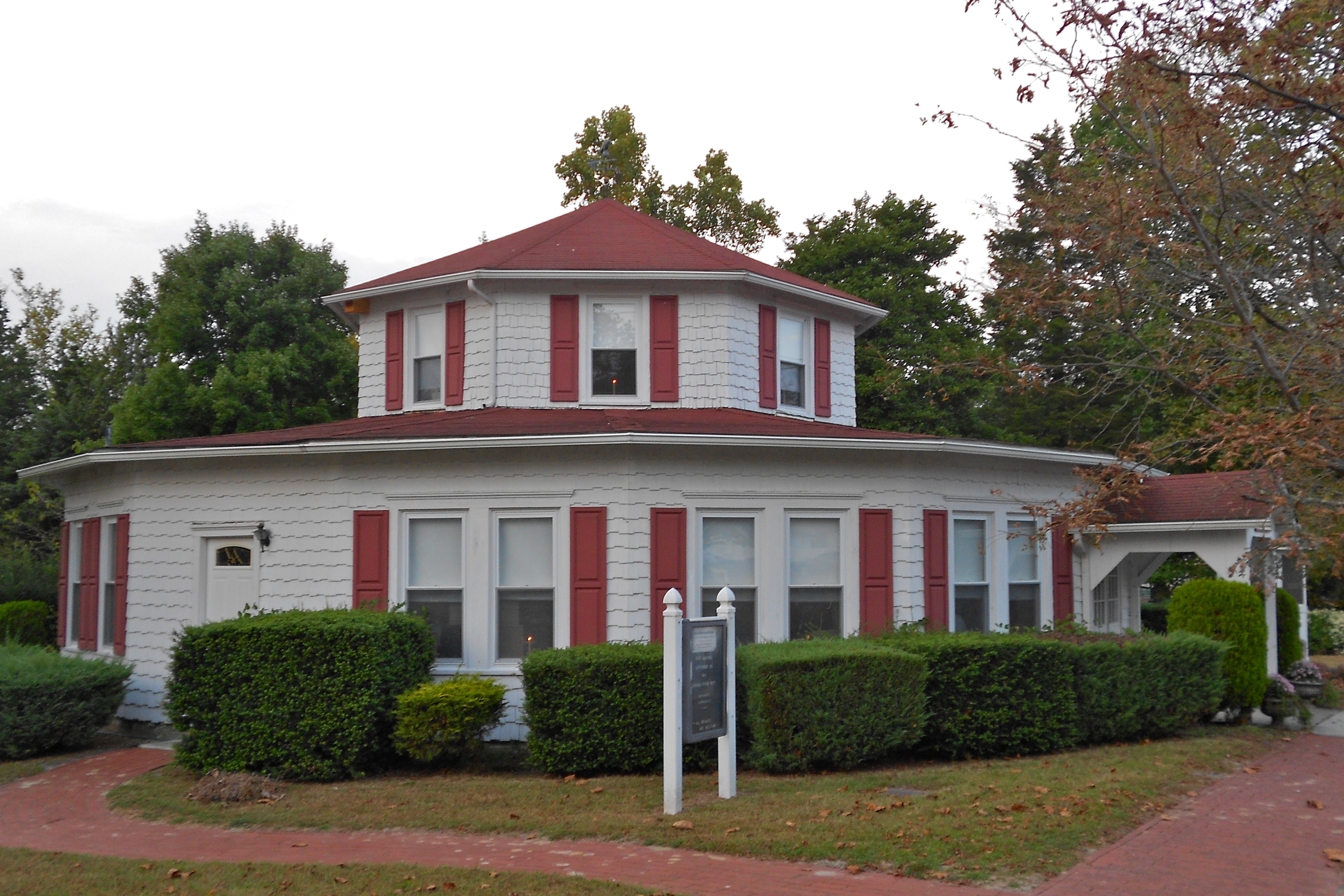
- Roundhouse Museum

- Location within Atlantic County, New Jersey Location within New Jersey Location within the United States
- Location: Junction of Claudius Street and London Avenue; Egg Harbor City, New Jersey
- Coordinates: 39°32′11″N 74°38′34″W
- Area: 3.7 acres (1.5 ha)
- Architectural style: Shingle Style
- NRHP reference No.: 91000267
- NJRHP No.: 412

Significant dates
- Added to NRHP: March 20, 1991
- Designated NJRHP: January 29, 1991

The Neutral Water Health Resort Sanitarium, also known as Dr. Smith's Sanitarium Site, is a historic site located at the junction of Claudius Street and London Avenue in Egg Harbor City in Atlantic County, New Jersey. It was added to the National Register of Historic Places on March 20, 1991 for its significance in archaeology and health/medicine. It includes one contributing building, one contributing site, and three contributing structures. The last remaining building is now known as the Roundhouse Museum, operated by the Egg Harbor City Historical Society.

== History and description ==
In 1905, Dr. Charles Smith built the Neutral Water Health Resort to treat patients with muscle problems. Patients would soak and walk in the serpentine canal to get the benefits of cedar water. The complex had several buildings, including a large sanitarium, sun house, several bath houses, and windmill. The polygonal sun house is the only remaining building. It has 12 sides on the first story, and 8 sides on the second. Dr. Smith operated the facility until 1921. The main sanitarium building was destroyed by fire c. 1923.

In 2005, a park dedicated to Peace Pilgrim was established here, including the serpentine canal.

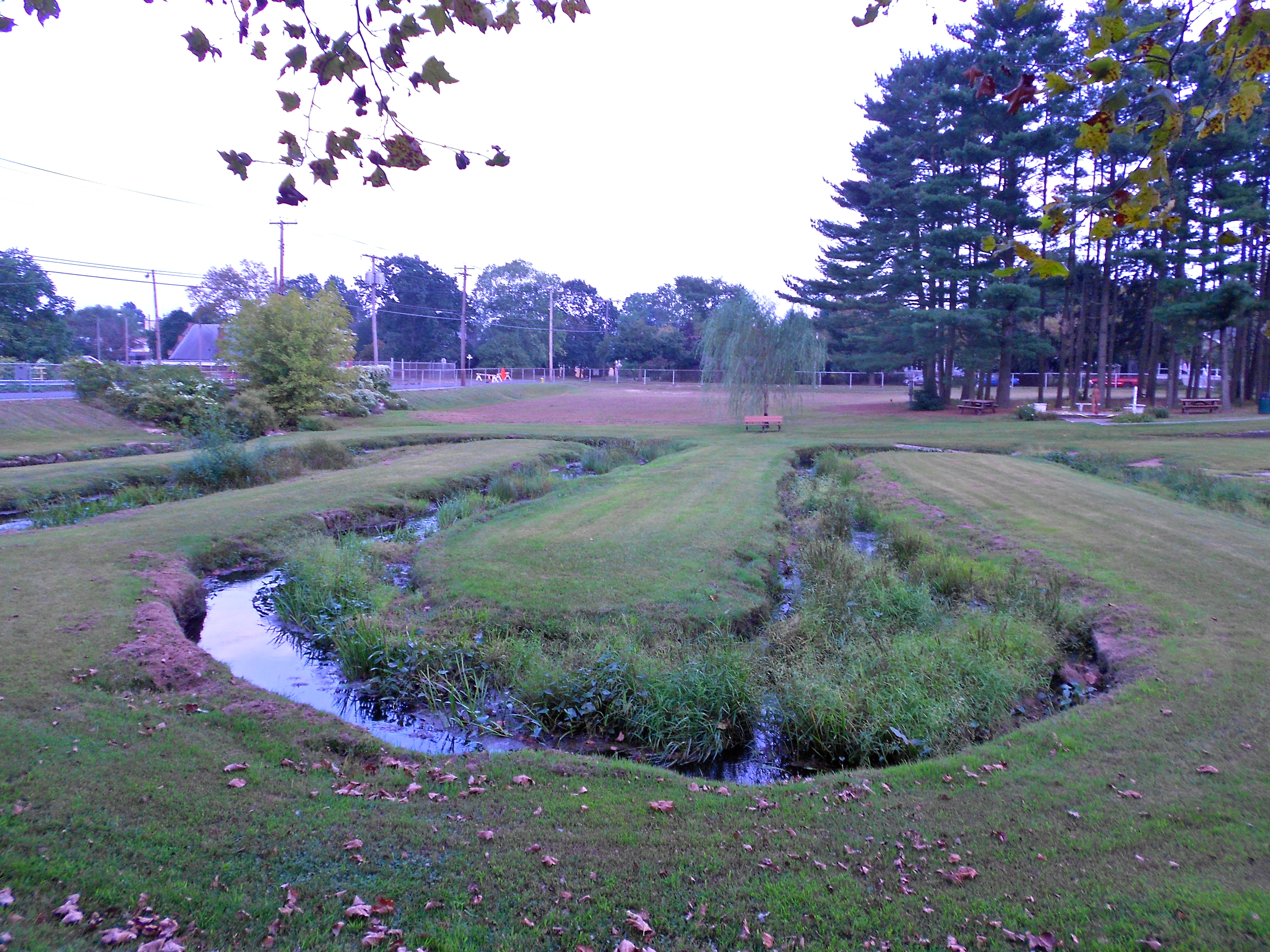
Serpentine canal, now part of Peace Pilgrim Park

== See also ==
- National Register of Historic Places listings in Atlantic County, New Jersey
- List of museums in New Jersey
- Peace Pilgrim
