= Miller-Cory House =

Historic house in New Jersey, United States

- U.S. National Register of Historic Places
- New Jersey Register of Historic Places
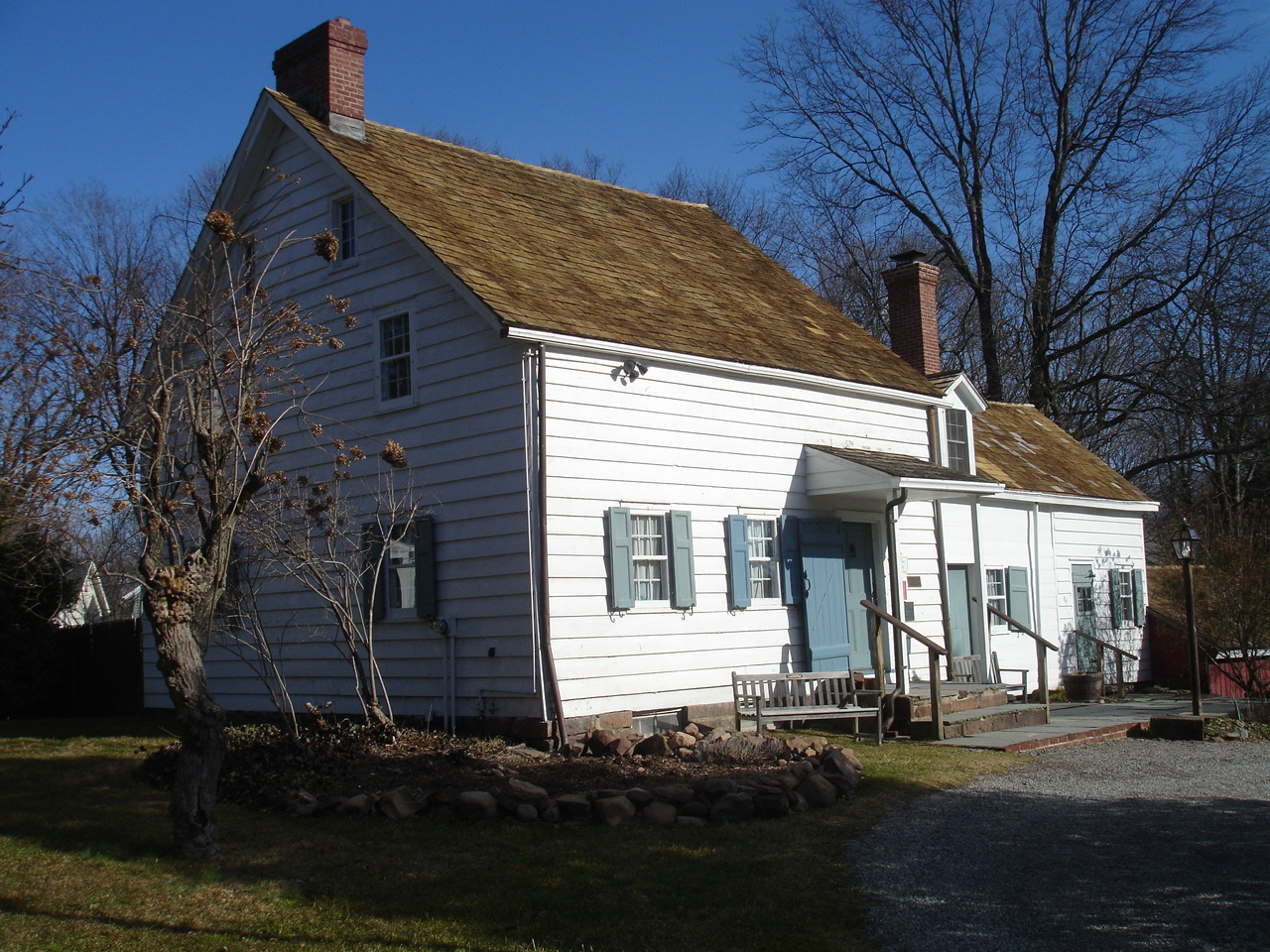

- Location within Union County, New Jersey Location within New Jersey Location within the United States
- Location: 614 Mountain Avenue, Westfield, New Jersey
- Coordinates: 40.6626°N 74.3499°W
- Area: 0.8 acres (0.32 ha)
- Built: 1740
- NRHP reference No.: 72000808
- NJRHP No.: 2736

Significant dates
- Added to NRHP: November 3, 1972
- Designated NJRHP: March 13, 1972

The Miller-Cory House is located in Westfield, Union County, New Jersey, United States. The house was built in 1740 and was added to the National Register of Historic Places on November 3, 1972.

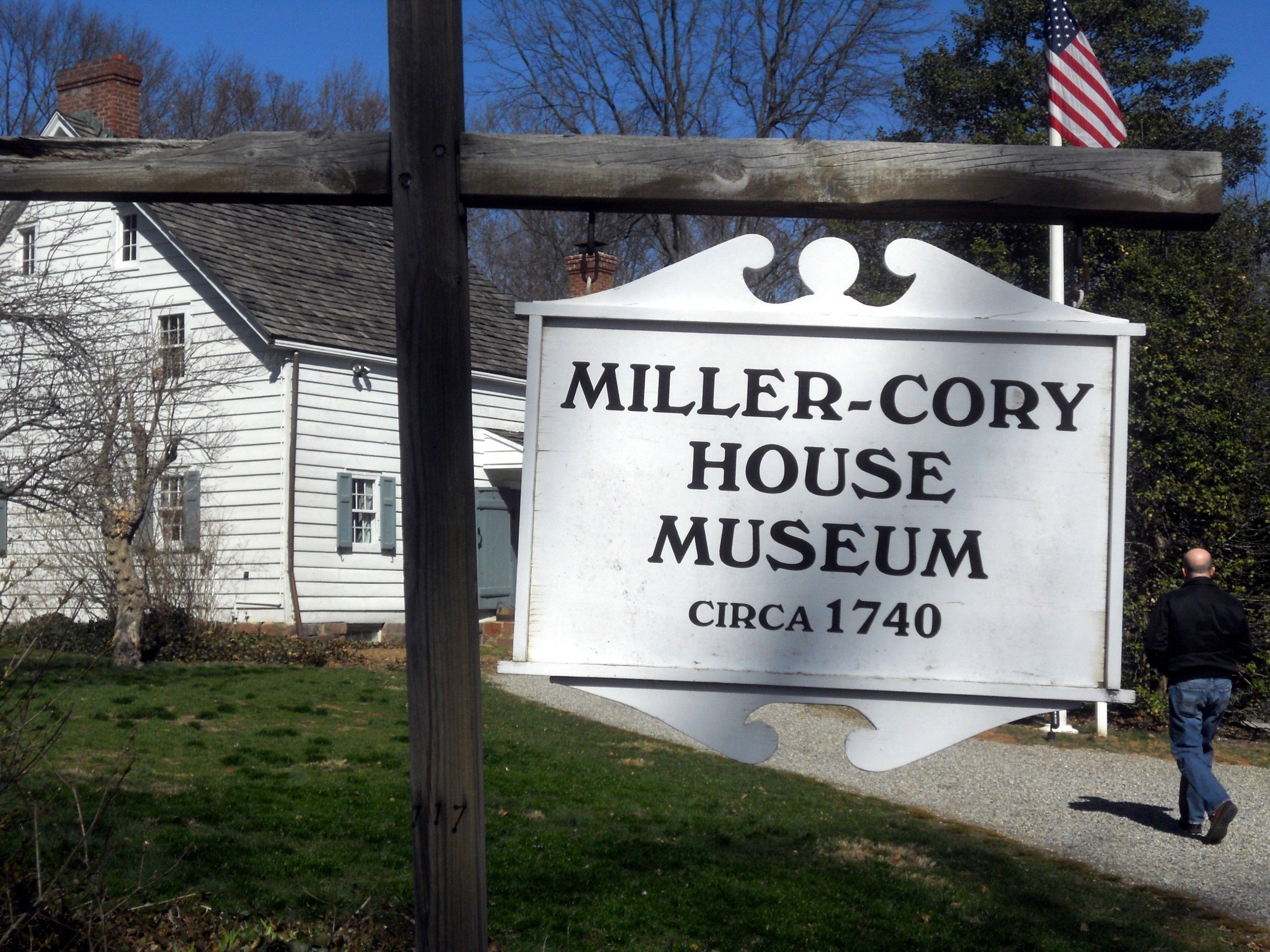
Miller Cory House

== See also ==
- National Register of Historic Places listings in Union County, New Jersey
- List of museums in New Jersey
