= Montville Schoolhouse =

- U.S. National Register of Historic Places
- New Jersey Register of Historic Places
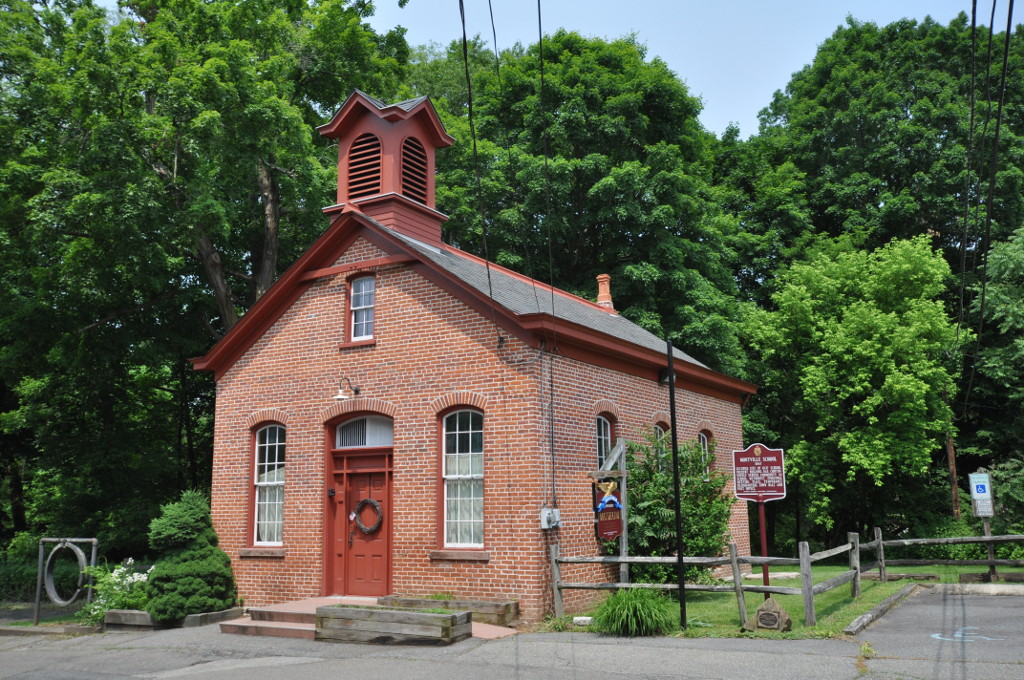

- Location within Morris County, New Jersey Location within New Jersey Location within the United States
- Location: 6 Taylortown Road; Montville, New Jersey
- Coordinates: 40°55′03″N 74°23′03″W
- Built: 1871
- Architectural style: Late Victorian
- NRHP reference No.: 09001075
- NJRHP No.: 4413

Significant dates
- Added to NRHP: December 11, 2009
- Designated NJRHP: September 11, 2009

The Montville Schoolhouse is a historic one-room schoolhouse located at 6 Taylortown Road in the township of Montville in Morris County, New Jersey. The red brick schoolhouse was built in 1871 and added to the National Register of Historic Places on December 11, 2009, for its significance in education and politics/government. Since 1963, it has been the home of the Montville Township Historical Society and Museum.

== History and description ==
The schoolhouse was built in 1871 on the site of two previous schoolhouses. It was also used by the Methodist Episcopal Church. The township used it as the first town hall from 1911 to 1939. The post office was located here from 1943 to 1961.

== See also ==
- National Register of Historic Places listings in Morris County, New Jersey
- List of museums in New Jersey
