= Millville Executive Airport =

Millville Executive Airport Millville Army Airfield

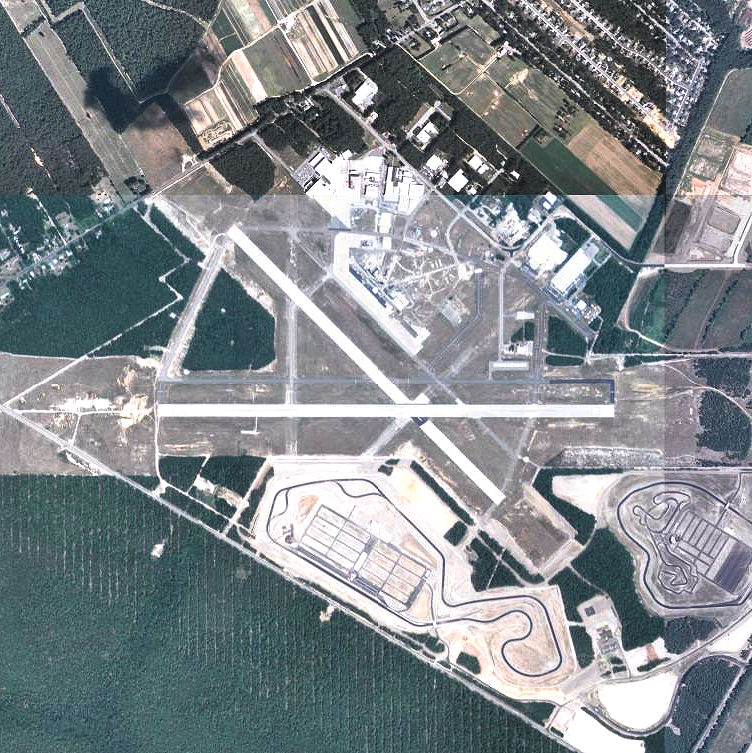
- 2006 USGS airphoto
- IATA: MIV; ICAO: KMIV; FAA LID: MIV

Summary
- Airport type: Public
- Owner: DRBA - City of Millville
- Serves: Millville, New Jersey
- Elevation AMSL: 85 ft / 26 m
- Coordinates: 39°22′04″N 75°04′20″W
- Website: mivairport.com

Map
- Interactive map of Millville Executive Airport

Runways
Direction	Length		Surface
Direction	ft	m	Surface
10/28	6,002	1,829	Asphalt
14/32	5,057	1,541	Concrete

Statistics (2010)
- Aircraft operations: 60,000
- Based aircraft: 73
- Source: Federal Aviation Administration

Millville Executive Airport (IATA: MIV, ICAO: KMIV, FAA LID: MIV) is in Millville, in Cumberland County, New Jersey. The airport, 4 miles (6.4 km) southwest of the Millville city center, is owned by the Delaware River and Bay Authority (DRBA) and the City of Millville.

It was dubbed "America's First Defense Airport" because of the nearly 1,500 pilots who trained in gunnery practice at the airport with the Republic P-47 "Thunderbolt" plane during World War II.

== History ==
The Millville airport was dedicated on August 2, 1941, by local, state, and federal officials. The first contingent of Air Corps personnel arrived on 17 December 1942. In less than a year construction of base facilities began, and in January 1943, the Millville Army Air Field opened as a United States Army Air Forces gunnery school for fighter pilots. It was assigned to First Air Force.

Gunnery training began with Curtiss P-40 Warhawks, but after a few weeks the P-40s were gone, and the Republic P-47 Thunderbolt ruled the skies over Cumberland County. During its three-year existence, thousands of soldiers and civilians served here, with about 1,500 pilots receiving advanced fighter training in the Thunderbolt. The 361st Fighter Group trained at Millville during July and August 1943 prior to their deployment to Ninth Air Force in England. In 1944 the 135th Army Air Forces Base Unit (Flying) took control of the airfield.

On 30 October 1945 Millville AAF was inactivated and on 31 December the airfield was declared excess to the governments needs, and returned to the City of Millville through the War Assets Administration (WAA). Most of the airport buildings were converted to apartments for the many veterans returning from the war. The last of the apartments vanished in the early 1970s, and the airport became a hub of industry and aviation for Southern New Jersey.

The original base headquarters and Link Trainer buildings today house the Millville Army Air Field Museum.

== Facilities ==
The airport covers 916 acres (371 ha) at an elevation of 85 feet (26 m). It has two runways: 10/28 is 6,002 by 150 feet (1,829 x 46 m) asphalt and 14/32 is 5,057 by 150 feet (1,541 x 46 m) concrete.

In 2010 the airport had 60,000 aircraft operations, average 164 per day: 95% general aviation and 5% military. 73 aircraft were then based at the airport: 78% single-engine, 12% multi-engine, 8% jet and 1% helicopter.

Big Sky Aviation is the current FBO on the field serving general aviation traffic, with full service 100LL Avgas and Jet A fuel.

Services include aircraft maintenance, fixed wing flight instruction and scenic flights.

On site is a diner, Verna’s Flight Line Restaurant.

The airport is used for general aviation and is home to Dallas Airmotive, Cooper 1 Ambulance operated by Cooper University Hospital, Atlantic Air Ambulance, and PHI Helicopters.

=== Free trade zone ===
Millville Airport is part of United States Free Trade Zone #142, which includes the Port of Salem and licensed to the South Jersey Port Corporation (SJPC).

== In popular culture ==
The airport is a setting in the television show The Blacklist, season 1, episode 21, "Berlin (No. 8)".

== See also ==
- List of airports in New Jersey
- New Jersey World War II Army Airfields
