= Millville Army Air Field Museum =

- Location within New Jersey
- Former name: Millville Municipal Airport Museum
- Established: 1984
- Location: Millville, New Jersey
- Coordinates: 39.3720°N 75.0725°W
- Type: Aviation museum
- Founder: Michael T. Stowe
- Website: www.p47millville.org

The Millville Army Air Field Museum is an aviation museum located at Millville Executive Airport in Millville, New Jersey focused on the history of Millville Army Air Field.

== History ==
=== Background ===
Beginning in seventh grade, Michael T. Stowe began excavating World War II artifacts from around Millville Municipal Airport.

=== Establishment ===
Seeking a place to display his collection, Stowe founded the Millville Municipal Airport Museum in 1984. It opened in May of the following year in Building 35 following renovations. The museum moved to the larger Building 1 in 1985 and was incorporated three years later. A year prior, Stowe recovered aircraft parts of a P-47 from the bottom of the nearby Union Lake. After being forced to close for a year due to building problems, the museum reopened in 1989 with a new name, the Millville Army Air Field Museum and a plan to build a half-scale replica of a P-47.

The museum acquired the collections of the Philadelphia Seaplane Base Museum in 2000.

Following the demolition of three historic structures at the airport in early 2004 and a proposal to tear down a fourth, plans for a historic district were introduced. In the meantime, the museum had expanded its focus to include the post-World War II-era and grown to include a total of three buildings.

The city proposed reducing the size of the historic district and demolishing derelict buildings in 2016. Two years later, the museum began renovating Building 31, which originally housed the quartermaster's office, to use as a shop and collections storage in 2018.

== Facilities ==
The Henry E. Wyble Historic Research Library & Education Center is located at the museum.

== Exhibits ==
Exhibits at the museum include a Link Trainer.

The museum also features a series of five exterior murals depicting a various scenes related to the airport's history, such as a P-47 Thunderbolt on a gun boresight range and the World War II-era fire department at the base. (Note: A sixth mural is located on the side of Millville City Hall in downtown Millville.) Also located outside is a monument dedicated on the 75th anniversary of the airport.

== Collection ==
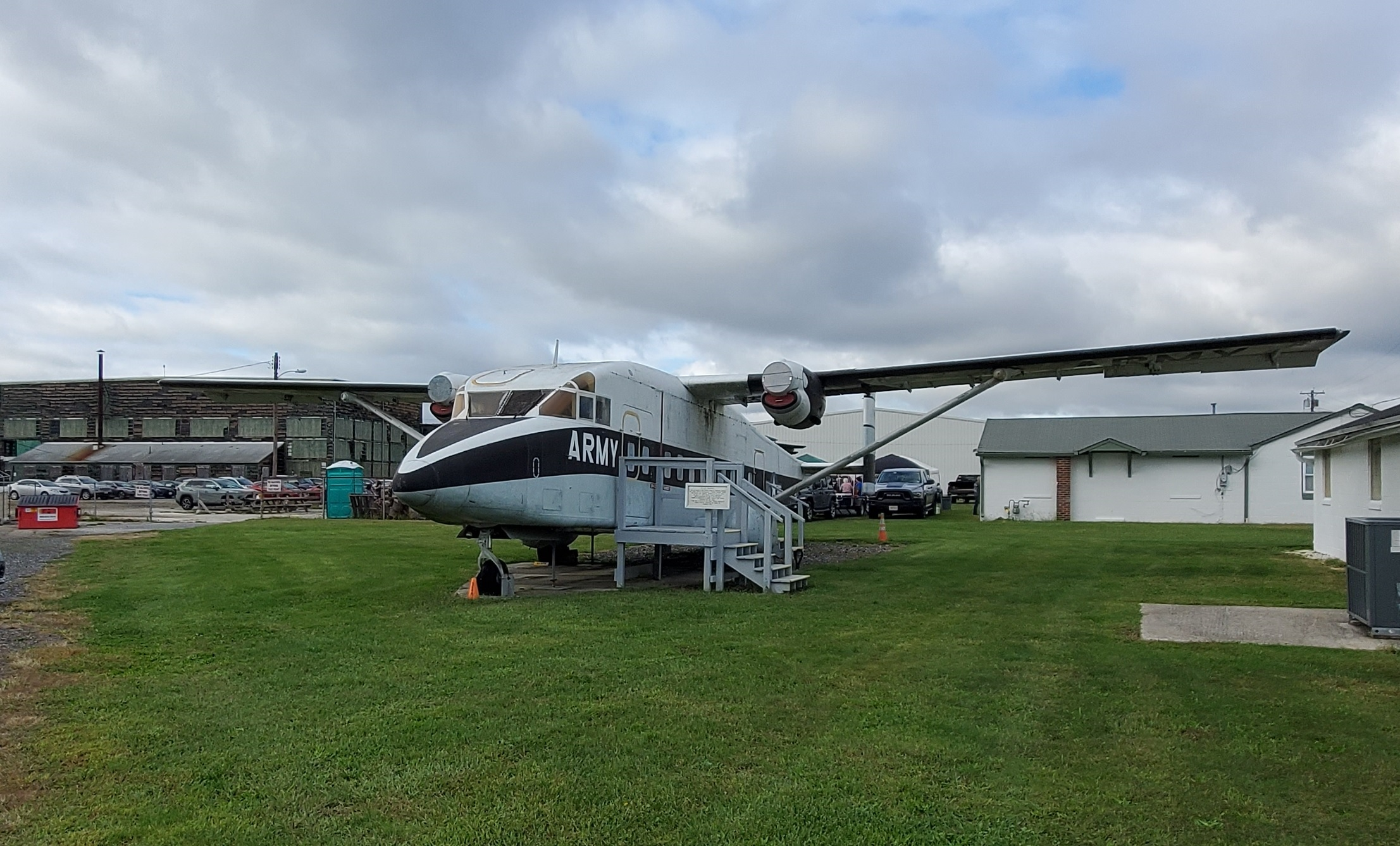
Sherpa 85-25343 on display

=== Aircraft ===
- Douglas A-4F Skyhawk
- Douglas R4D-6 – nose only
- Short C-23B Sherpa

=== Ground vehicles ===
- M60A3

== Events ==
The museum holds an annual Veterans Appreciation Day event and an annual Millville Wheels & Wings Airshow.

== Programs ==
The museum takes part in the Veterans History Project.

== See also ==
- List of aviation museums
