= Ronald Podrow =

American spiritual writer

Peace Pilgrim II
- Born: May 16, 1926; London, England
- Died: December 19, 2004 (aged 78); Burnaby, British Columbia
- Spouse: Heather Podrow

Ronald Leonard Podrow (May 16, 1926 – December 19, 2004), a.k.a. Peace Pilgrim II, was an American pacifist and peace activist. Inspired by the life and work of the woman known as Peace Pilgrim, who in her lifetime had abandoned personal possessions and walked over 25,000 miles for peace until her death in 1981, Peace Pilgrim II likewise gave up material possessions in 1989 and began walking for peace until given shelter, and fasting until provided food.

== Biography ==
Peace Pilgrim II was raised in Jersey, Channel Islands, until he and his family, who were of Jewish origins, were evacuated for their protection just before the landing of German forces in World War II. Trained as a jeweler, he married and lived in Cape Town, South Africa, where his two sons were born. In the 1950s, he relocated his family to the Los Angeles area. He remarried after his first wife's death in 1975, and though his second marriage ended in divorce, he remained a close friend and supporter of his second wife until her death.

In 1980, Podrow retired from the jewellery business at the age of 54, and over the next 9 years gave of himself to people, counseling and speaking, and developing a deeper purpose to his life. In 1989, he received the call to pilgrimage – a call he initially resisted, but which his third wife, Heather Podrow, called "the greatest turnaround of his life."

Peace Pilgrim II was only able to walk the first year of his pilgrimage. After 2,000 miles on foot, his hips required surgical replacement, but he continued his pilgrimage thereafter with the aid of a donated car and Social Security benefits. He developed other health issues but continued his pilgrimage undaunted for several more years.

In April 1999, Peace Pilgrim II was diagnosed with prostate cancer, and later with cancer of the right kidney, which he ultimately lost in 2002. In January 2000 he married his third wife, Heather Podrow.

Peace Pilgrim II died in Burnaby, British Columbia, on December 19, 2004. His life and work were commemorated in a memorial service in Vancouver on May 15, 2005.

== See also ==
- List of peace activists
- Peace Pilgrim
