= Shore Institute for Contemporary Art =

Coordinates: 40.30363°N 73.98802°W

The Shore Institute of the Contemporary Arts (SICA) was a non-profit arts center in Asbury Park, New Jersey. It was previously located in Long Branch, New Jersey, United States, located in the former Lincoln Can Manufacturing building.

Founded in 2000, the physical institute was officially opened in 2004. SICA had a gallery, a cafe, artists studios and classrooms. The cafe hosted local bands, film screenings, meetings and performances. SICA offered artists instruction and speakers as well as yoga classes. They also held the yearly ArtX performance event.

The institute has closed as of December 2012.
