= Andrews-Barlett Homestead =

Historic house in New Jersey, US

Coordinates: 39.6011°N 74.3438°W

The Andrews-Bartlett Homestead is located in the village of Tuckerton Seaport on Main Street in Tuckerton in Ocean County, New Jersey near the Baymen's Museum.

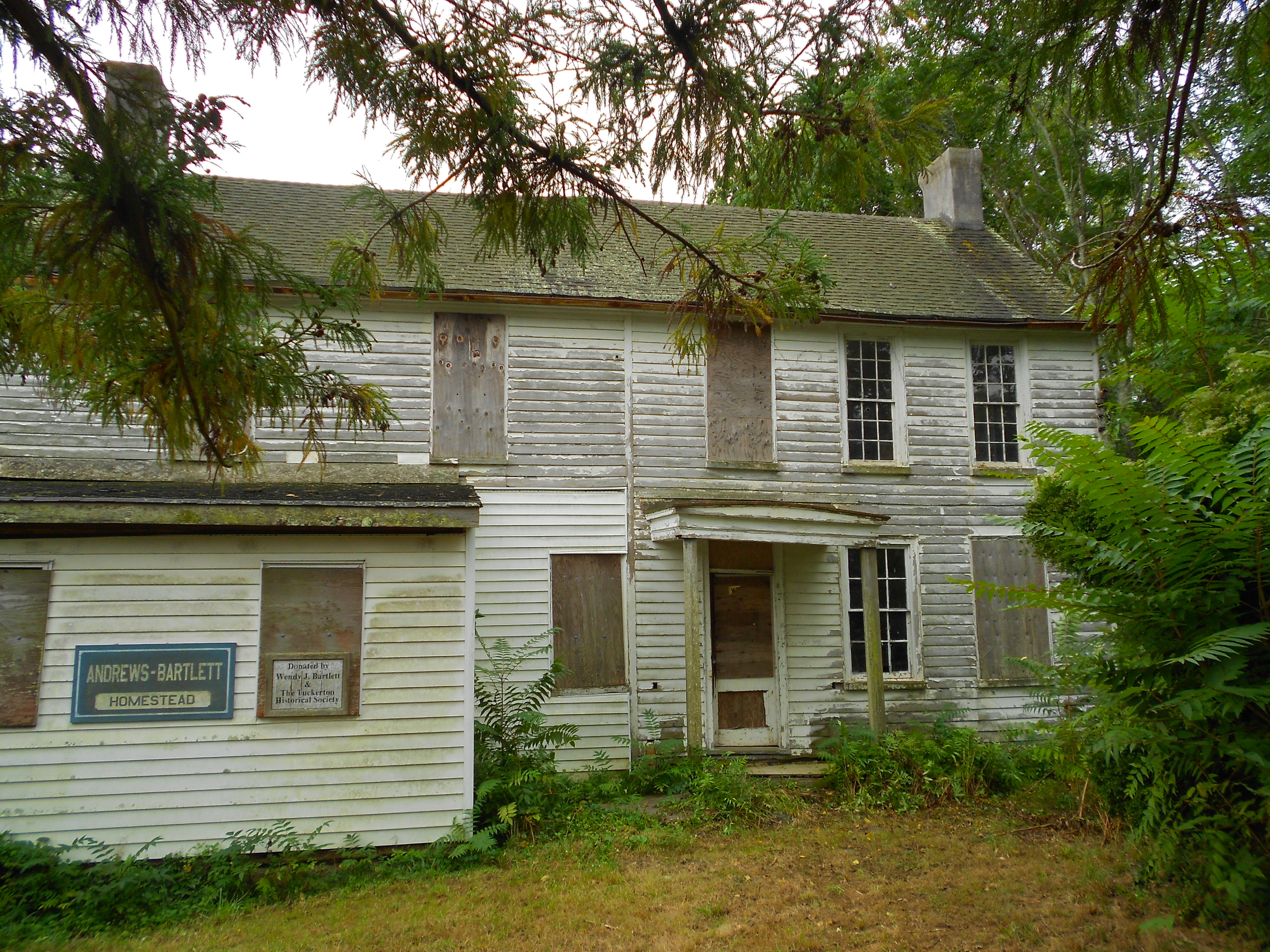

The original section of the house was built c. 1699 and is believed to be the oldest home in Ocean County, New Jersey. Mordecae Andrews built the original two-room home in 1699. Nathan Bartlett bought the house in 1824 and enlarged the entire structure, encompassing the original portion in the center and actually completely surrounding it.

Partial funding for restoration of the building was in place as of 2017. Some repairs were made in 2019.

== See also ==
- Bartlett-Rockhill-Bartlett House
- List of the oldest buildings in New Jersey
- List of the oldest buildings in the United States
- National Register of Historic Places listings in Ocean County, New Jersey
- New Jersey Historic Trust
