= Bartlett-Rockhill-Bartlett House =

Coordinates: 39.601300°N 74.343370°W

- U.S. National Register of Historic Places
- New Jersey Register of Historic Places
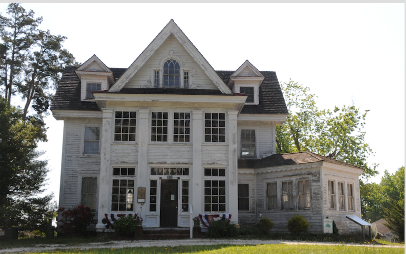

- Location within Ocean County, New Jersey Location within New Jersey Location within the United States
- Location: Tuckerton Seaport; Tuckerton, New Jersey
- Built: 1855
- NRHP reference No.: 11001041
- NJRHP No.: 4781

Significant dates
- Added to NRHP: January 20, 2012
- Designated NJRHP: April 10, 2012

Bartlett-Rockhill House, also known as the Sea Captain's House, is located in the village of Tuckerton Seaport on Main Street in Tuckerton in Ocean County, New Jersey near Baymen's Museum.

The house was constructed circa 1855 for Edmund Bartlett and was later owned by the sea captain, Capt. Zebedee W. Rockhill. It was purchased by Bartlett's nephew, J. Henry Bartlett's, in 1910, who lived there until 1945. The house combines of late Federal and early Victorian styles, with additions and alterations made to the house up until the 1930s. Now owned by the museum, the house is used for temporary storage, occasional events Victorian-era interpretation.

The building was listed as Bartlett-Rockhill-Bartlett House on the New Jersey Register of Historic Places on December 12, 2012 and the National Register of Historic Places on January 20, 2012.

== See also ==
- Andrews-Barlett Homestead
- National Register of Historic Places listings in Ocean County, New Jersey
- New Jersey Historic Trust
