= Emily Ann Wellman =

English actress and playwright (c. 1884–1946)

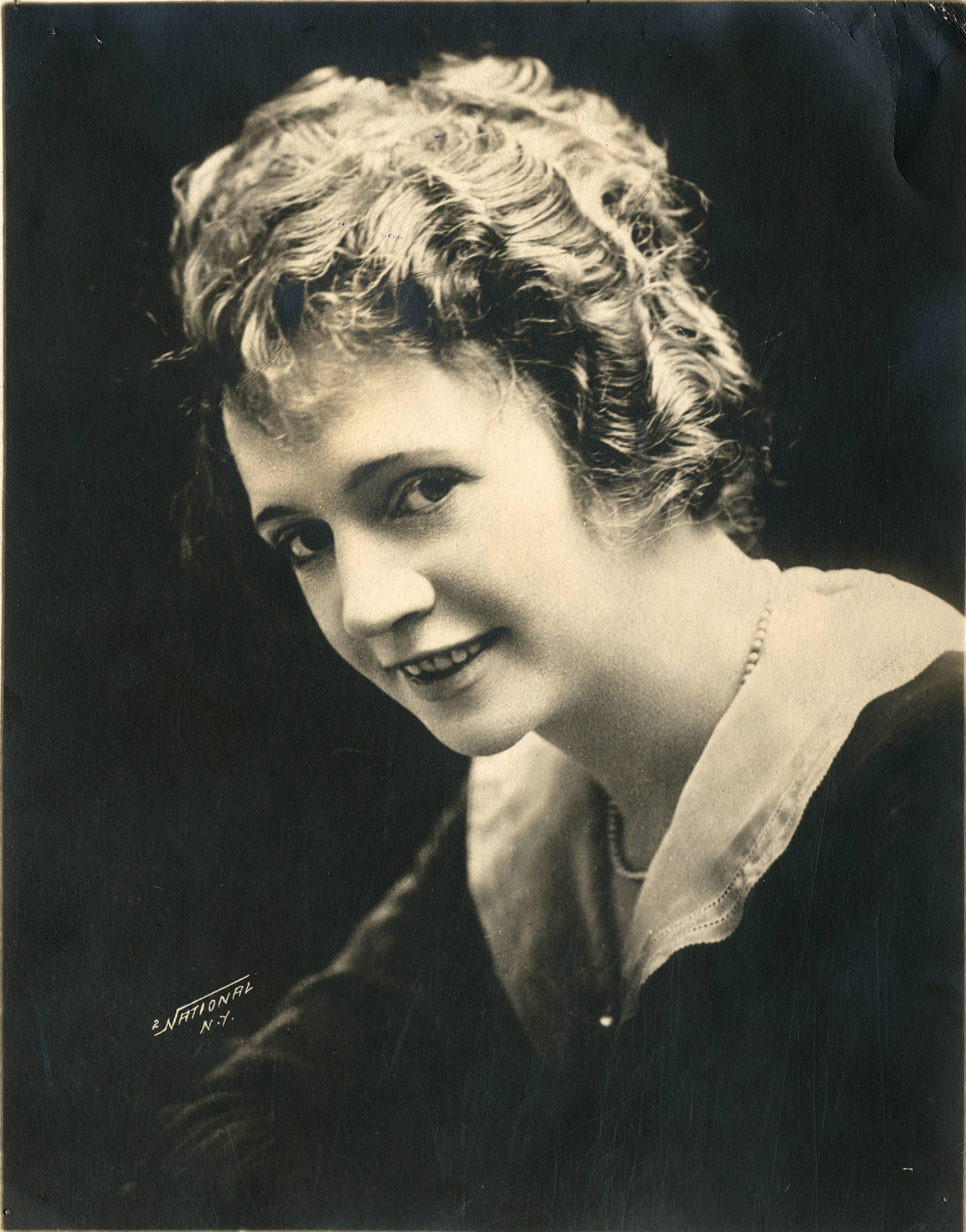
Wellman in 1920

Emily Ann Wellman (c. 1884 – March 19, 1946), also known as Emily Ann Barker, was an English born stage actress and playwright. Her earliest Broadway credit is from 1908 in The Man Who Stood Still, produced by William A. Brady. She appeared with Louis Mann and Mathilde Cottrelly in The Cheater in 1910 and again with Mann in 1912 in Elevating A Husband. In 1920, a play she wrote called A Question of Time was produced off Broadway by A. H. Woods. She died in New York City on March 19, 1946.

== Marriages ==
She was married at least three times once to a Billy Dornberg and then a physician Dr. H. W. Wellman by whose surname she acted under professionally. Her final marriage was to the actor Richard Gordon.

== Selected plays ==
- The Who Stood Still (1908)
- The Cheater (1910)
- Elevating a Husband (1912)
- The Unborn (1915)
- The Guilty Man (1916)
- The Wasp (1923)
- The Dagger (1925)
