= Richard Gordon (actor) =

American actor

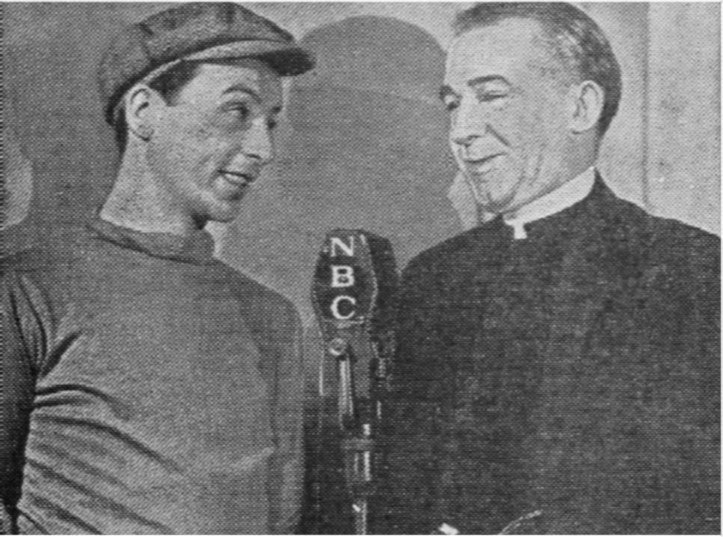
Ken Lynch and Gordon (right) in the radio program The Bishop and the Gargoyle

Richard Gordon (October 25, 1882 – December 11, 1967) was an American actor for vaudeville and stage performances, movies, and radio. He was perhaps best known for acting as the title character for the radio version of The Adventures of Sherlock Holmes.

== Early years ==
A native of Bridgeport, Connecticut, Gordon worked as a reporter for a newspaper there before he relocated to New York City and became a reporter for the New York World. His earnings paid for his studies at Yale University and the American Academy of Dramatic Arts.

== Radio ==
In addition to his work for The Adventures of Sherlock Holmes from 1931 to 1933, Gordon's roles for old-time radio included those shown in the table below:

Program	Role
The Bishop and the Gargoyle	The Bishop
Follow the Moon	Tetlow
Hilda Hope, M.D.	Dr. Boros
Jane Arden	Jane's father
Orphans of Divorce	Cyril Worthington
Our Gal Sunday	Dr. Abbott
Pepper Young's Family	Mr. Jerome
Reginald Fortune	Reginald Fortune
Stella Dallas	Morgan Ford
Thatcher Colt Mysteries	Thatcher Colt
Valiant Lady	Jim Barrett

Gordon was also heard on The Biblical Hour and for Shakespearean productions.

== Stage and movies ==
After he refused a producer's offer of $35 per week for a minor part in a play, Gordon spent 10 years with a theatrical touring company. Films in which Gordon appeared included The Birth of a Baby, 13 Rue Madeleine, St. Benny the Dip, and Things to Come.

== Professional organizations ==
Gordon was involved with founding the Actors' Equity Association. Not long after it was formed, however, he encountered conflicts with officers of the organization as he advocated for inclusion of actors from movies and radio. Those efforts apparently resulting in his quitting the group's council after five years. As continued growth of radio resulted in the formation of another group to represent that medium's actors, Gordon served as an advisor to the new American Federation of Radio Artists.

== Personal life ==
Gordon married three times, always to actresses with whom he was performing currently or had done so previously. The first marriage, beginning in January 1907, was to Denver-born actress Rachel Crown, with whom Gordon had two children, and with whom he continued to appear onstage at least as late as the summer of 1910. Next, from 1923 until her death in 1946, was Emily Ann Wellman, an actress and playwright with whom Gordon performed vaudeville acts. To help her promote her works to producers, Gordon built a miniature theater using a scale of one-half inch to one foot. The couple prepared miniature props to enable creation of sets to help producers visualize the production of a play. Gordon, whom one newspaper reporter described as an "actor-carpenter", used his workshop, which was equipped with saws, drill press, planer, and lathe. Finally, from about 1946 until at least 1964, he was married to Boston-born former actress Margaret Brainard (né Taylor), with whom he had co-featured more than three decades before in a well-received stage adaptation of Harold Bell Wright's novel The Winning of Barbara Worth.
