= The Bishop and the Gargoyle =

1936-1942 old-time radio crime drama

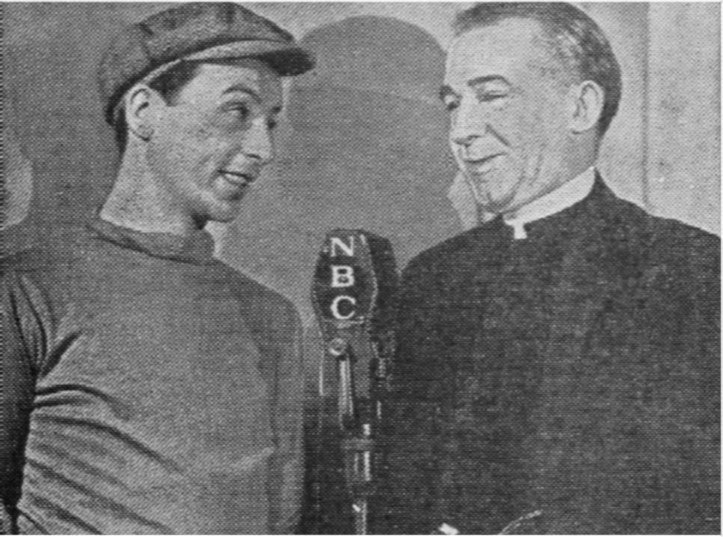
- Ken Lynch and Richard Gordon in 1941.
- Genre: Crime drama
- Running time: 30 minutes
- Country of origin: United States
- Language(s): English
- Syndicates: NBC Blue
- Starring: Richard Gordon; Milton Herman; Ken Lynch
- Original release: September 30, 1936 – January 3, 1942
- Sponsored by: Chase & Sanborn Coffee

The Bishop and the Gargoyle is a 30-minute old-time radio crime drama in the United States. It was broadcast on the NBC Blue network September 30, 1936 - January 3, 1942. The program was unique in being a radio network prime-time drama with a clergyman as its main character.

== Format ==
Episodes of The Bishop and the Gargoyle concerned the combined crime-fighting efforts of a retiring bishop of a church and a convict called the Gargoyle. As a member of the parole board at Sing Sing prison, the Bishop met and befriended the Gargoyle. In return, the inmate helped the bishop "to track criminals and bring them to justice". Radio historian John Dunning wrote in On The Air: The Encyclopedia Of Old-Time Radio, "They became friends and, after the Gargoyle's release, formed a crime-fighting duo, with the Bishop supplying the spiritual guidance and the Gargoyle the muscle.

An advertisement for the program in the October 2, 1940, issue of the trade publication Variety described the two characters as follows:

There's the Bishop, for example. A retired gentleman of the cloth — cultured, benevolent and infinitely wise; a man whose worldly grasp and shrewd wit are no less strange than his hobby of crime detection! The Gargoyle, on the other hand, is an ex-lawbreaker — "retired" through the Bishop's persuasion. The Gargoyle's untiring loyalty and direct, elemental approach to the facts and conditions of life is a constant source of polite astonishment to the Bishop.

== Personnel ==
Richard Gordon acted as the bishop; Milton Herman first had the role of the Gargoyle, with Ken Lynch replacing him later. Joseph Bell was the director, and Frank Wilson was the writer.

== Adaptation ==
On November 29, 1941, NBC-Television presented "The Item of the Scarlet Ace" (an episode of The Bishop and the Gargoyle) as an early experiment of television broadcasting.
