= The Second Time Around (1961 film) =

1961 film by Vincent Sherman

- Theatrical release poster
- Directed by: Vincent Sherman
- Screenplay by: Oscar Saul; Clair Huffaker (as Cecil Dan Hensen)
- Based on: Star in the West; 1951 novel by Richard Emery Roberts
- Produced by: Jack Cummings
- Starring: Debbie Reynolds; Steve Forrest; Andy Griffith
- Cinematography: Ellis W. Carter
- Edited by: Betty Steinberg
- Music by: Gerald Fried
- Production company: Cummings-Harman Productions
- Distributed by: Twentieth Century-Fox
- Release date: December 22, 1961
- Running time: 99 minutes
- Country: United States
- Language: English

The Second Time Around is a 1961 American CinemaScope Comedy Western film starring Debbie Reynolds as a widow who relocates her family from 1912 New York to Arizona, the newest state of the Union. It is based on the novel Star in the West by Richard Emery Roberts.

The film co-stars Andy Griffith and Steve Forrest. It was directed by Vincent Sherman.

== Plot ==
Lu Rogers, recently widowed, leaves her children in New York with her mother-in-law in 1911 and travels west to take a job she has been offered. Upon arriving in Arizona, the job falls through, so rancher Aggie Gates tries her out as a hired hand.

The resourceful Lu succeeds at work and catches the eye of two potential suitors, Dan Jones, a saloon owner, and Pat Collins, a rancher. Lu exposes a crooked sheriff and, to her shock, is offered his job. The humiliated sheriff pulls a holdup and kidnaps her.

A posse is formed and comes to Lu's rescue. She receives reward money and uses it to send for her kids. Dan wins her hand, while Pat accepts her badge.

== Cast ==
- Debbie Reynolds as Lucretia Rogers
- Steve Forrest as Dan Jones
- Andy Griffith as Pat Collins
- Juliet Prowse as Rena Mitchell
- Thelma Ritter as Aggie Gates
- Ken Scott as Sheriff Burns
- Isobel Elsom as Mrs. Rogers
- Rudolph Acosta as Rodriguez
- Timothy Carey as Bonner
- Tom Greenway as Deputy Shack
- Eleanor Audley as Mrs. Trask
- Blossom Rock as Mrs. Vera Collins
- Jack Orrison as Editor

== Reception ==
Bosley Crowther, critic for The New York Times, wrote, "Don't look for quality in it. Just go there expecting nothing more than another chance to watch Miss Reynolds fluff her fine little feathers prettily, Miss Ritter play the hard-boiled softie, Andy Griffith chew the fat bucolically, and Mr. Forrest act the noble scapegrace, and you may have a pretty good time."

Emanuel Levy described it as a "mildly engaging Western comedy".
