= Jack Orrison =

American actor

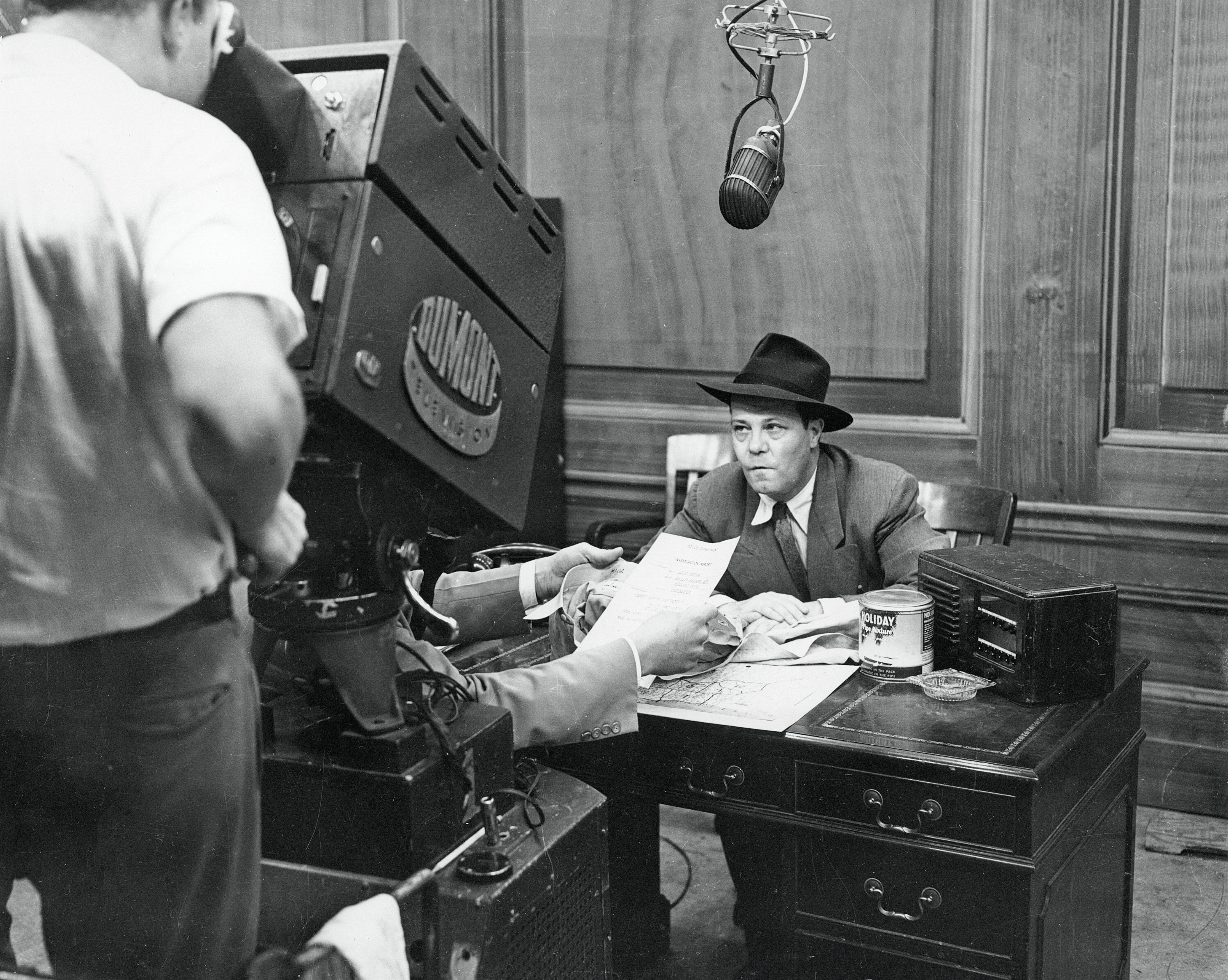
- Jack Orrison on The Plainclothesman
- Born: October 12, 1909; Victor, Colorado, U.S.
- Died: June 3, 1986 (aged 76); Los Angeles, California, U.S.
- Years active: 1937–1968
- Spouse: Margaret K. Smith (m. 1937)

Jack Orrison (October 12, 1909 – June 3, 1986) was an American actor and script writer who worked in radio, television and films. He is best known for his acting roles in The Plainclothesman and I Married a Monster from Outer Space. Orrison was born in Victor, Colorado, but moved to other cities to work in the field of entertainment. He enlisted in the United States Army during World War II.

== Early life ==
Jack Huffaker Orrison was born October 12, 1909, in Victor, Colorado, the son of Peter Kemp Orrison and Lena Mable Smiley Orrison. He attended the University of Denver for three years.

Orrison moved to Denver, Colorado to work at radio station KOA. In 1937 he moved to Pittsburgh, Pennsylvania to work at radio station KDKA, where he was both a writer and actor in the comedy radio series Adam and Eve. His costar was Margaret K. Smith, whom he met at the University of Denver. Orrison and Smith were married on November 20, 1937, at the home of KDKA manager A. E. Nelson. The marriage license lists the occupation of both spouses as "Radio Script writer".

Besides being heard on Adam and Eve Orrison acted in the KDKA radio series Under Western Skies, starting on November 10, 1937. From January 26, 1938, to May 10, 1938, the western series was heard on the NBC Blue Network before reverting to a local series, until leaving the air in 1939.

On February 15, 1939, Orrison resigned from KDKA radio to move to New York City. A 1942 Billboard article stated that he was one of the American Federation of Radio Artists members who’d entered military service.

== Post-World War II acting career ==
Orrison's post-war acting work included being added to the cast of the CBS radio serial Strange Romance of Evelyn Winters. He was also in an episode of the 1948 radio series Call the Police.

From 1949 to 1954 Orrison played Sergeant Brady in The Plainclothesman on the DuMont Television Network. This was a police procedural drama, seen through the eyes of an unnamed lieutenant. With exception to one flashback segment, the lieutenant was never seen, leaving Orrison's Sergeant Brady as the only character viewers saw each week.

From 1949 to 1951 he appeared on six episodes of DuMont's Captain Video and His Video Rangers as Commissioner of Public Safety Bell.

Orrison continued to work in radio, and from 1955 to 1957 he was heard on six episodes of X Minus One. He was on episodes of John Steele, Adventurer (1949) and Gang Busters (1955).

Film roles include Detective in Somebody Up There Likes Me (1956), Haskins in Wolf Larsen (1958), Officer Schultz in I Married a Monster From Outer Space (1958), Osborne in Never Steal Anything Small (1959), Police Clerk in Al Capone (1959), Editor in The Second Time Around (1961), Dr. Creston in Wild in the Country (1961), and Bartender in Move Over, Darling (1963).

Orrison played William Vedder in the 1959 Hawaiian Eye episode Cloud Over Koala; Shopkeeper in the 1961 Gunsmoke episode The Squaw; Warren Bullard in the unsold TV pilot Down Home, shown in 1965 on the CBS summer series Vacation Playhouse; and Mr. Butcher in the 1967 The Wild Wild West episode The Night of the Bogus Bandits.

== Death ==
Orrison died on June 3, 1986, in Los Angeles, California. He was 76 years old.
