= Tuckerton Seaport =

- Established: May 2000
- Location: 120 West Main Street (Route 9); Tuckerton, NJ 08087; United States
- Coordinates: 39.6020°N 74.3427°W
- Type: Maritime museum
- Website: Tuckerton Seaport

The Tuckerton Seaport is a working maritime village and museum located in Tuckerton, a borough situated on the Jersey Shore, within Ocean County in the U.S. state of New Jersey. The 40-acre (160,000 m^{2}) site, which opened in May 2000, features 17 historic and recreated buildings connected by a boardwalk, a maritime forest and wetlands nature trail. The seaport, which is a member of the Council of American Maritime Museums, celebrated its 10th anniversary in 2010.

== History ==
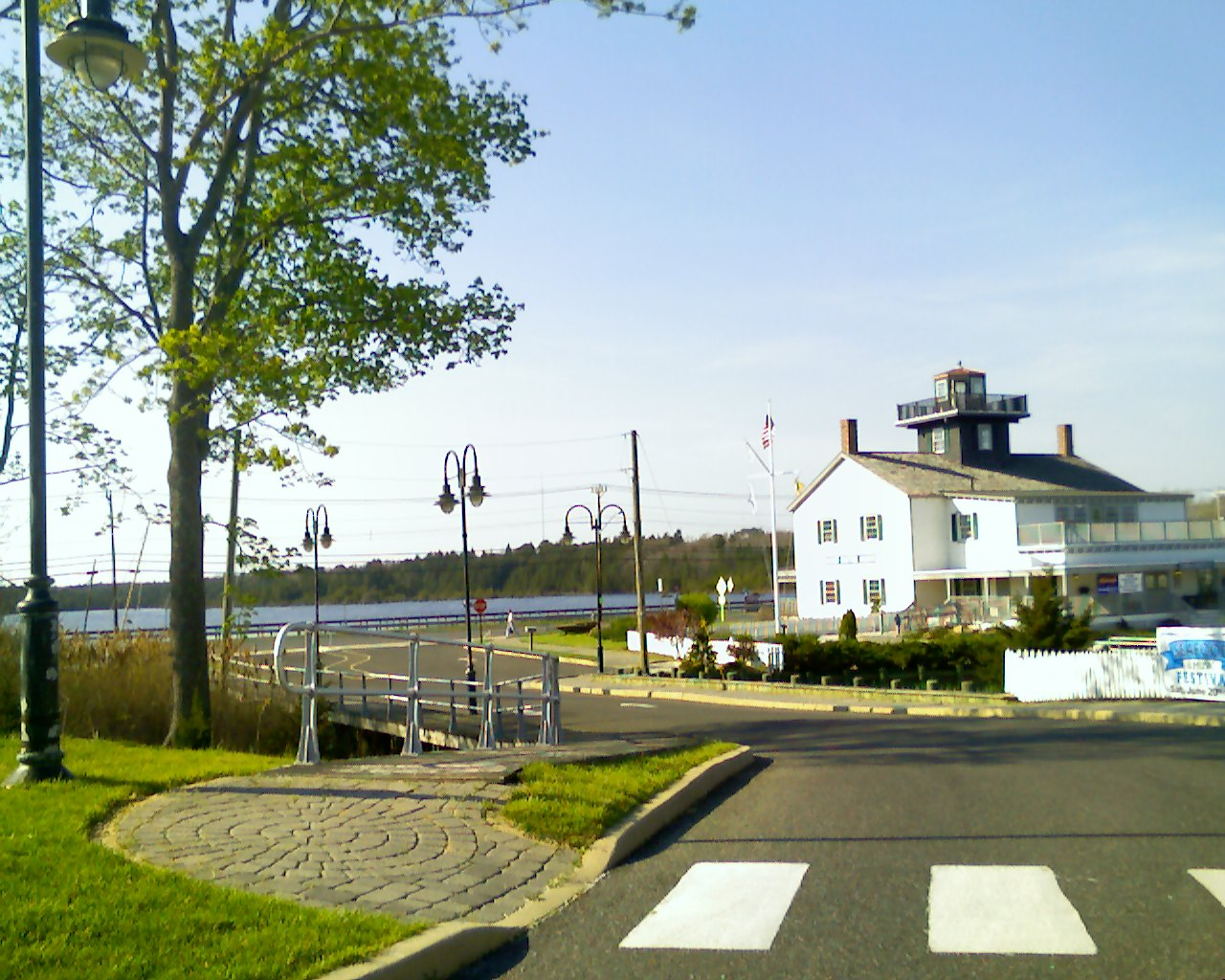
View of Lake Pohatcong seen from the parking lot of the Tuckerton Seaport

The site of the Tuckerton Seaport was built on a formerly-wooded site along Tuckerton Creek, which had long been slated for commercial development. In 1989, plans for a motel, campground, and marina were brought to the planning board. July 1993, Barnegat Bay Decoy and Baymen's Museum opened adjacent to Stanley "Tip" Seaman Park, on a site currently occupied by tennis courts. The Baymen's museum officially announced a revised plan for commercial development on the Tuckerton Creek site, an 11-building village dubbed the "Tuckerton Seaport". However, as planning and development were underway, the plan for the site grew larger than originally proposed.

Developed by the Casino Reinvestment Development Authority, the $11.3 million Tuckerton Seaport project officially opened on May 13, 2000, to a crowd of over a thousand, dedicated by then-governor Christine Todd Whitman and the widow of Jacques Cousteau, among others. However, the village held an unofficial "soft opening" a week earlier. In preparation for the new traffic created by the museum, the intersection of Route 9 and Great Bay Boulevard was redesigned, eliminating the "fork in the road" and the addition of Tuckerton's second traffic light. The nautical-style lampposts seen throughout the seaport were originally located at the former Trump Marina in Atlantic City, but were dismantled and then shipped to Tuckerton to make way for the Atlantic City–Brigantine Connector.

The special edition New Jersey license plate known as "Baymen's Heritage" features an image of the Tucker's Island Lighthouse along with a Canada goose decoy. The plates were introduced in 1998 to benefit the construction of the Tuckerton Seaport; the plates are still available for purchase.

In 2010, the New Jersey Surf Museum opened at the seaport, which documents the culture of surfing in New Jersey as well as displaying of over 300 boards. It is the only surfing museum in the state.

== Exhibits ==
- Visitor Center/Gift Shop - The Visitor Center serves as for Tuckerton Seaport's partner organization, Jacques Cousteau National Estuarine Research Reserve. On the third floor, the "Life on the Edge" exhibit is dedicated to the Barnegat Bay Estuary. The lower floor of the Visitor Center features the "Walk on the Wildside" exhibit interpreting the four habitats of the Jersey Shore with a three wall mural and taxidermied animals.
- New Jersey Surf Museum - Museum documenting the history of surfing in New Jersey, where many rare or collectible boards are on display.

=== Preserved and recreated buildings ===
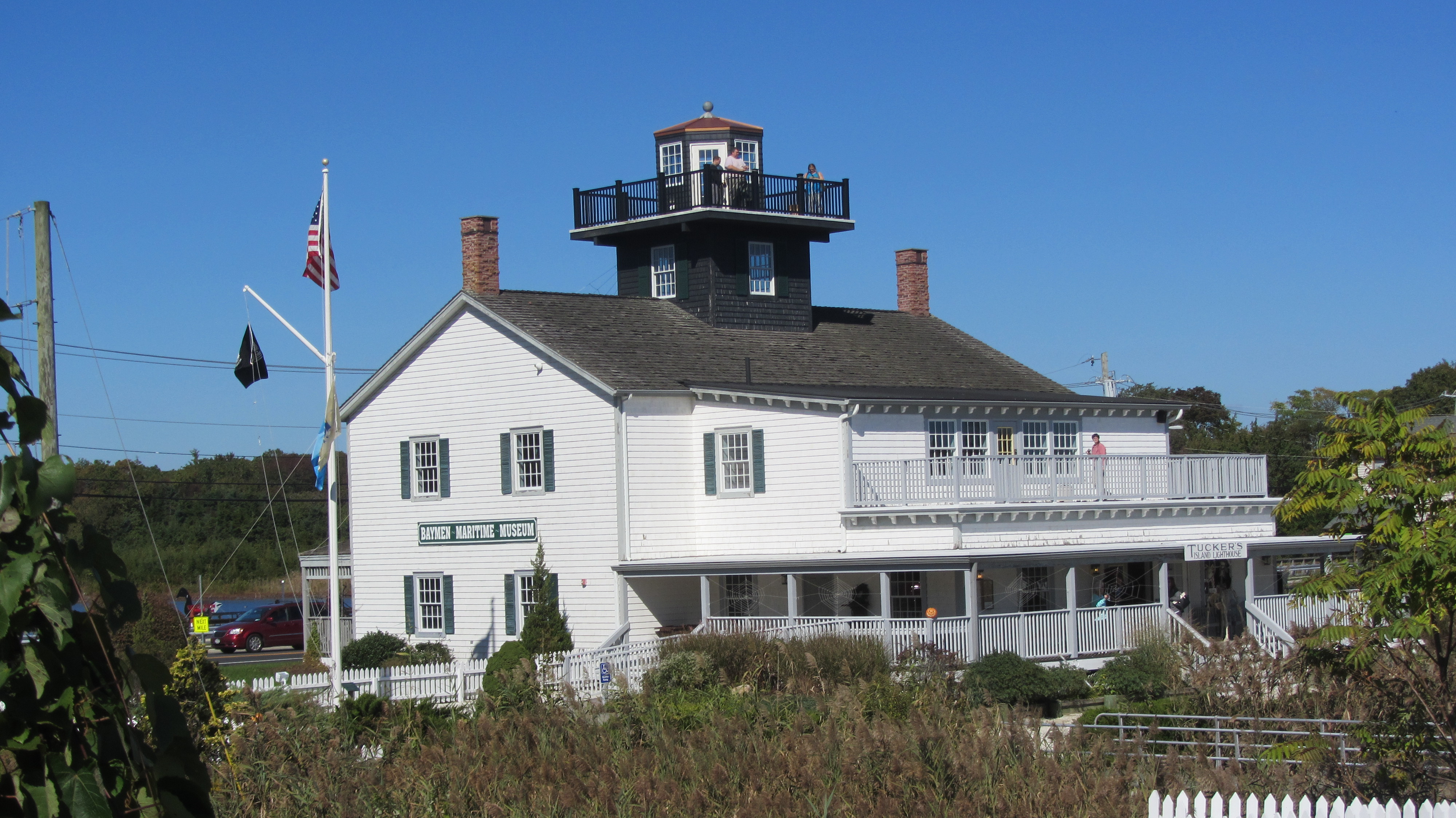
Tucker's Island Lighthouse

- Tucker's Island Lighthouse - The centerpiece of the Tuckerton Seaport, the Tucker's Island Lighthouse was located on Tucker's Island, a former resort community that was destroyed in a storm in the 1920s. It is currently located at the museum's entrance, fronting Route 9.
- Skinner/Donnelly & Periwinkle Houseboats - two historic houseboats preserved at the museum
- Joe Dayton's Sawmill
- Perrine Boatworks - A working boatworks and exhibits on the evolution and history of traditional boat building include vintage and newly constructed Barnegat Bay sneakboxes and garveys.
- Parson's Clam & Oyster House - A recreation of the former "Parson's Seafood" building
- Jay C. Parker's Decoy Shop - A recreated decoy workshop
- Crest Fishery - Scale recreation of the popular LBI pound fishery houses the Pound Fishing in NJ exhibit and interactive fish market.
- Hotel DeCrab - Representing the hotel industry during the early years of the Jersey Shore.
- Hunting Shanty - The structure is the original building of the Barnegat Bay Decoy and Baymen's Museum, which was moved to its current site in 2000.
- Sunny Brae Salt Box - The Salt Box's original structure dates from the early 18th century, but extensive reconstruction and additions to the home were made during the 1960s. The historic building serves as the Tuckerton Boro mayor's office as well as a municipal meeting hall.
- Sea Captain's House - A historic Victorian house built circa 1835.
- Andrews-Barlett Homestead - Built circa 1699 for one of the original founders of the Tuckerton Community, the Andrews Bartlett Homestead is considered the oldest home in Ocean County.

== See also ==
- National Register of Historic Places listings in Ocean County, New Jersey
- New Jersey Maritime Museum
