= The Plainclothesman =

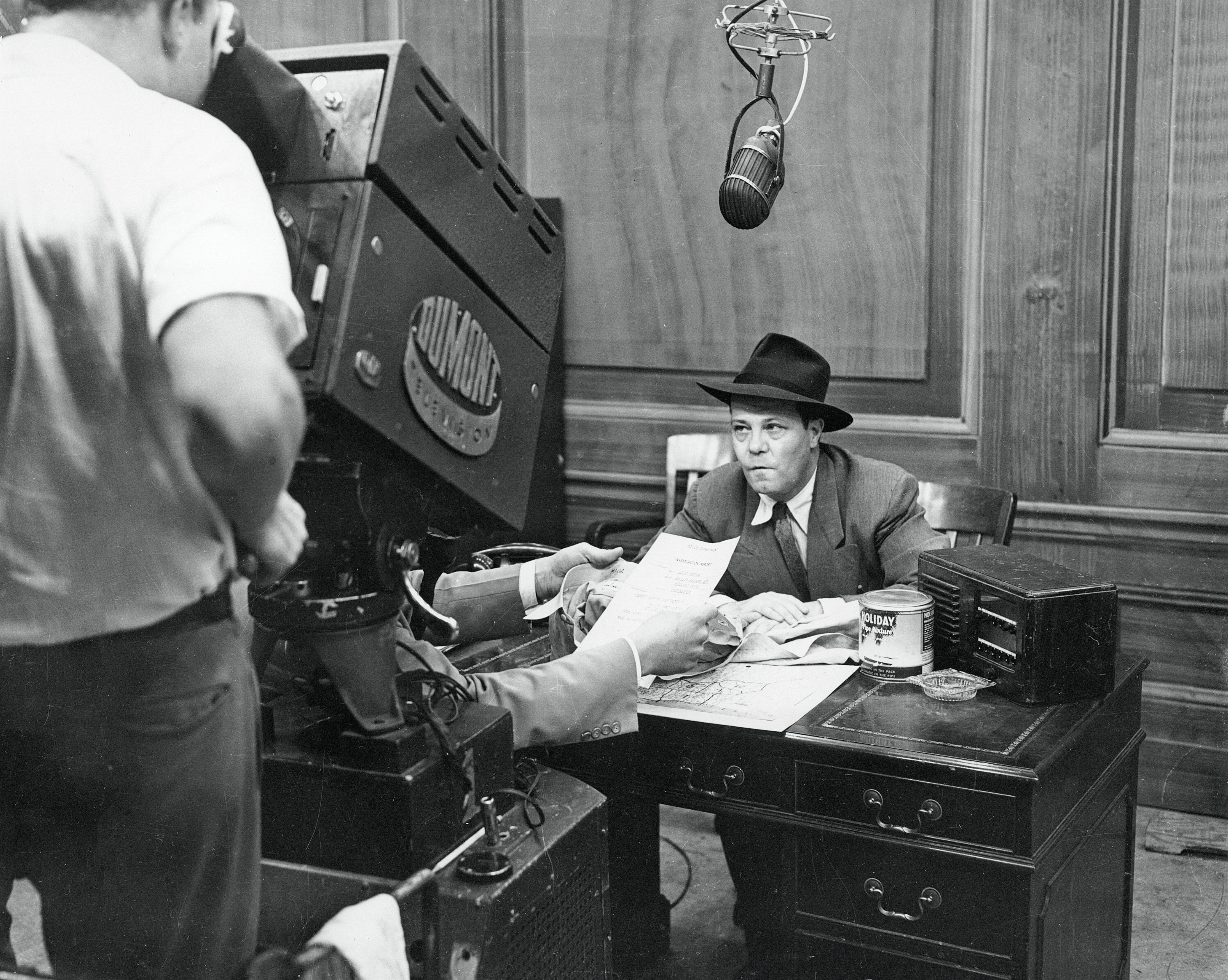
- Ken Lynch (face unseen) and Jack Orrison during broadcast
- Created by: Henry Opperman
- Written by: Donald S. Sanford; Lawrence Menkin
- Directed by: Sean Dillon; William Marceau
- Starring: Ken Lynch; Jack Orrison
- Country of origin: United States
- No. of episodes: 233

Production
- Running time: 30 minutes

Original release
- Network: DuMont
- Release: October 12, 1949 – September 12, 1954

The Plainclothesman is the first American police procedural series, and was broadcast on the DuMont Television Network from October 12, 1949, to September 12, 1954.

== Overview ==
The series ran from 1949 to 1954, and starred Ken Lynch, whose character was known only as "the Lieutenant". The main character's face was never seen on camera (with one exception) as the series used the "point of view shot" technique. The exception was a July 1952 episode, which featured flashbacks in which Lynch's (and the Lieutenant's) face was shown.

The series’ opening shows a desk with a gun and badge on it, with hands looking at the gun, then placing it in a shoulder holster. A voice-over states:

Hero without uniform. Unknown, unsung, but always on guard, protecting you against crime. Now see another criminal brought to justice through the eyes of the plainclothesman.

The viewer saw scenes as the Lieutenant did. If he lit a cigar, his hand came toward the camera with a lighted match, and the viewers saw the tip of the cigar at the bottom of their television screen. If the Lieutenant was knocked down, the camera showed the view of looking up from the floor. When his partner, Sergeant Brady, or other characters, talked with the Lieutenant, they looked directly at the camera.

The opening crime scene was shown in the objective style (not through the Lieutenant’s eyes), as were flashback scenes, where witnesses or suspects narrated what they saw.

== Cast ==
- Ken Lynch as "the Lieutenant"
- Jack Orrison as Sergeant Brady
- Helen Gillette as Annie the Waitress (1952 season)

== Production ==
The program was produced by DuMont, in association with Transamerican, an independent production company.

Arthur Forrest was a cameraman on the series. He used a camera on a bulky pedestal that was hard to control, but it had a small crane that allowed the camera to show the Lieutenant’s field of vision by focusing in on such items as the typewritten words on a corner’s report, or a bullet hole in a wall. If the Lieutenant was hit in the face, the camera was made to wobble, This technique may have been used as a cost-cutting device for cash-strapped DuMont, since union rules provided a lower-pay scale for unseen television performers.

When playing the Lieutenant, actor Ken Lynch often had to climb on the sides of the camera, or kneel underneath it for long periods of time. Around his neck was a specially-made hook to hold a microphone, so he could use his hands to hold papers, or a cigar that viewers needed to see through the “eye of the camera.”

== Broadcast history ==
The series was distributed by DuMont, and from October 1949 to May 1950 it aired Wednesdays at 9 pm ET on most DuMont affiliates, on Wednesdays at 9:30 pm ET from May 1950 to May 1951, and Sundays at 9:30 pm ET from June 1951 until September 1954. The last episode of The Plainclothesman aired on September 12, 1954. During the show's Sunday time slot it followed Rocky King Detective, and the two police procedurals were among DuMont's most popular series.

== Sponsor ==
The Plainclothesman was sponsored by Edgeworth Tobacco, and its tobacco product packages were often visible during episodes. The sponsor's commercials were done by the series' cast members, who remained in character during the sales pitch. As the trade publication Sponsor noted in an article "... Jack Orrison, who plays Sergeant Brady in the show, is seen exuding satisfaction as he puffs a Harvester Cigar into the face of the audience. Moreover, he shows how cozily the stogy fits into his vest pocket.” Carter Products became a co-sponsor of the show in 1953.

== Episodes and episode status ==
The April 20, 1952, episode was "The Missing Gift", with William Mendrick, Yuki Shumoda. Bill Zuckert, Shizu Mcriya, Kaie Deei, and Eileen Nakamura.

Researcher David Weinstein believes only four episodes have been preserved. One kinescoped episode of the series is held in the J. Fred MacDonald collection at the Library of Congress. One episode can be seen on YouTube.

== See also ==
- List of programs broadcast by the DuMont Television Network
- List of surviving DuMont Television Network broadcasts
