= Little Egg Harbor Friends Meeting House =

Historic meetinghouse in New Jersey, United States

- U.S. National Register of Historic Places
- New Jersey Register of Historic Places
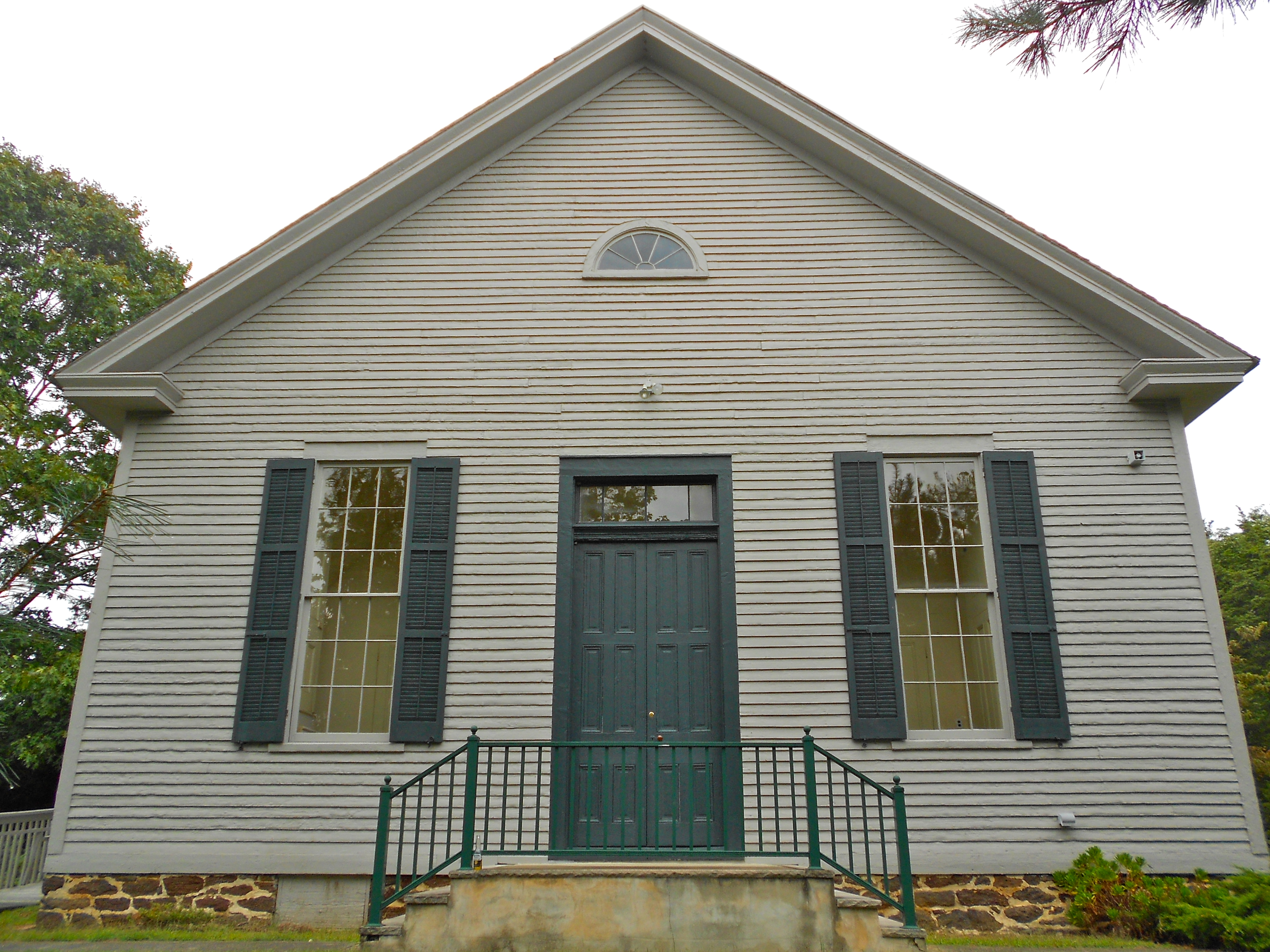

- Location within Ocean County, New Jersey Location within New Jersey Location within the United States
- Location: 21 E. Main Street, Tuckerton, New Jersey
- Coordinates: 39°36′12″N 74°20′29″W
- Area: 2.2 acres (0.89 ha)
- Built: 1863
- Architectural style: Mid 19th Century Revival
- NRHP reference No.: 02001511
- NJRHP No.: 4088

Significant dates
- Added to NRHP: December 9, 2002
- Designated NJRHP: October 18, 2002

The Little Egg Harbor Friends Meeting House is a historic Quaker meetinghouse located at 21 E. Main Street in the borough of Tuckerton in Ocean County, New Jersey, United States. The meetinghouse was built in 1863. It was documented by the Historic American Buildings Survey (HABS). The building was added to the National Register of Historic Places on December 9, 2002, for its significance in architecture and religion. Little Egg Harbor Meeting is part of Burlington Quarterly Meeting which is part of the Philadelphia Yearly Meeting. Friends continue to meet at Little Egg Harbor Meeting on Sundays at 10:30 a.m.

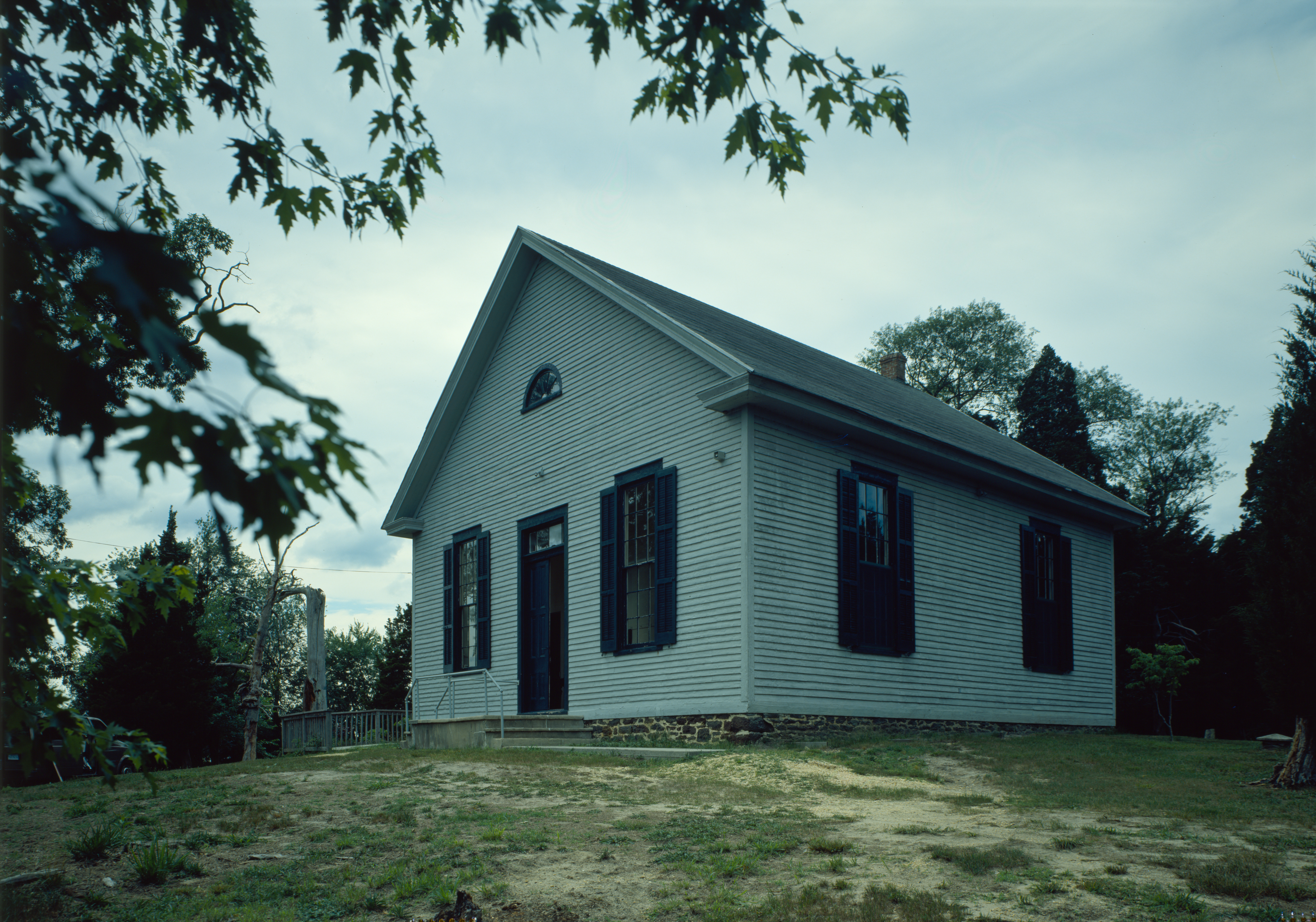
HABS photo of the meetinghouse

Little Egg Harbor Friends Meeting House shares its property with the Friends Burial Ground, which includes graves from the Parker, Pharo, and Ridgeway families.

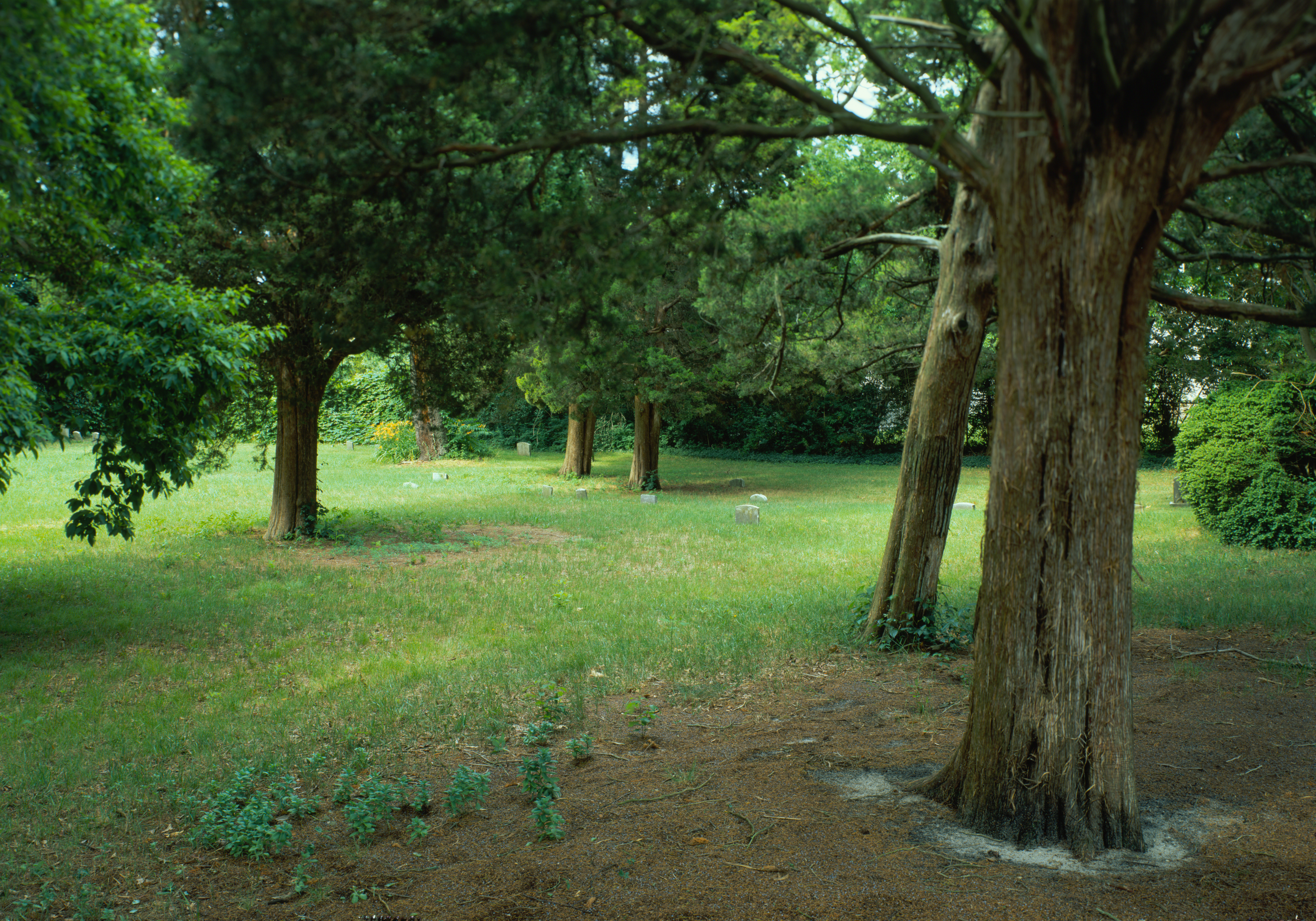
HABS photo of the burial ground

== See also ==
- National Register of Historic Places listings in Ocean County, New Jersey
