= New Jersey Maritime Museum =

Museum in Beach Haven, New Jersey

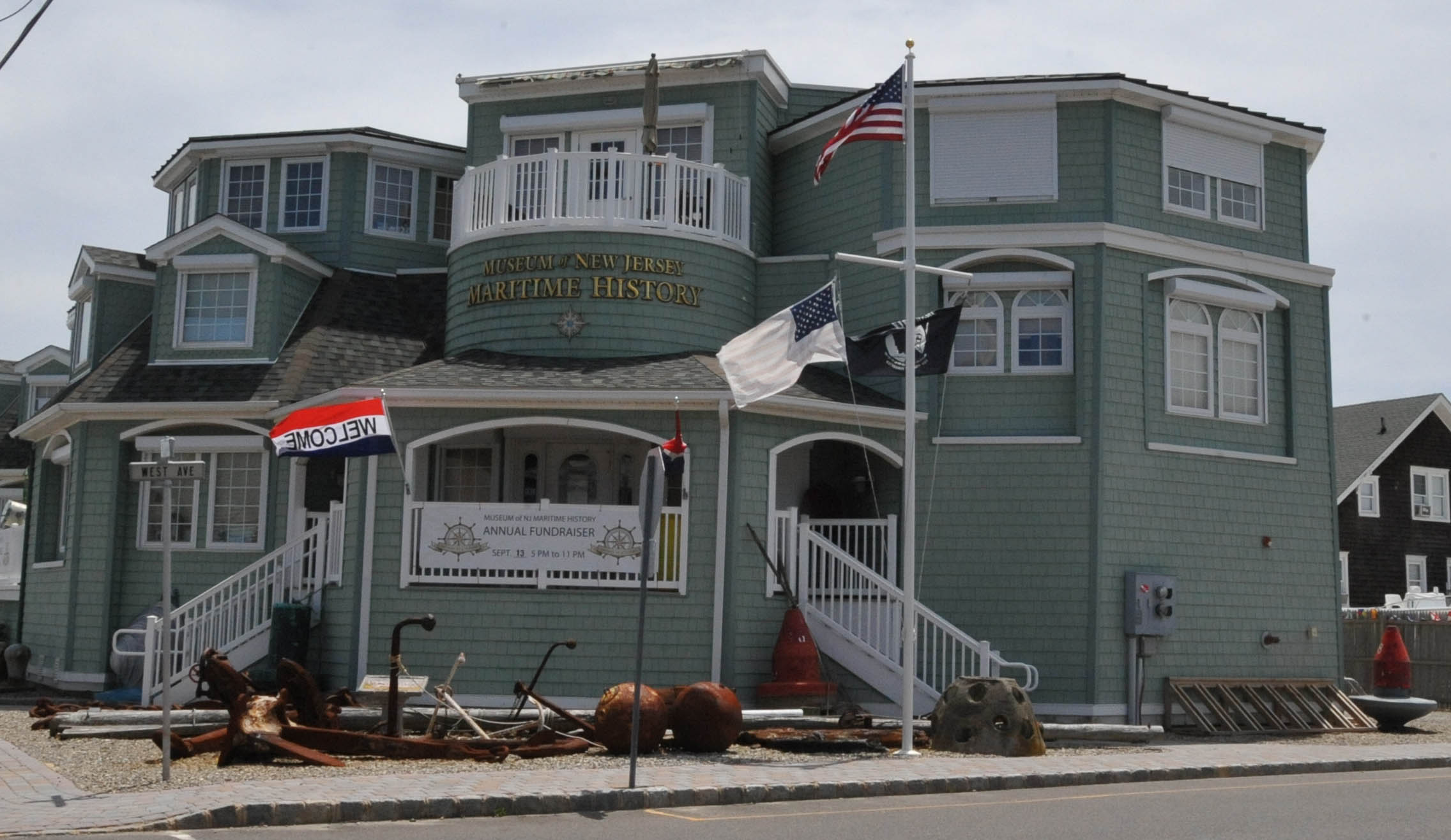
- Exterior of the museum, 2007
- Established: July 3, 2007
- Location: 528 Dock Rd; Beach Haven, NJ 08008; United States
- Coordinates: 39.5661279°N 74.2443341°W
- Type: Maritime museum
- Founder: Deborah Whitcraft
- Director: Jim Vogel
- President: Deborah Whitcraft
- Website: NJ Maritime Museum

The New Jersey Maritime Museum is a maritime museum in Beach Haven, New Jersey, on Long Beach Island. It opened its doors to the public on July 3, 2007. Its main areas of focus are shipwrecks off the New Jersey coast and their salvaged artifacts, scuba diving and the diving community, notable maritime incidents in New Jersey waters, and the history of the United States Life-Saving Service and its successor, the United States Coast Guard.

The museum covers various notable maritime incidents involving the Jersey Shore. It features a full room dedicated to the 1934 Morro Castle disaster, which museum president Deborah Whitcraft coauthored a book on, Inferno at Sea. A fire swept the Morro Castle; the damaged ship eventually beached itself near Asbury Park, NJ, but many of its passengers died in the fire. The incident is sometimes called "New Jersey's Titanic" due to the needlessly high loss of life. There is also an exhibit on the wreck of the USCS Robert J. Walker, a US Coast Survey (a predecessor to NOAA) vessel which sank near Atlantic City and resulted in the deaths of 20 crew. The Jersey Shore shark attacks of 1916; the collision of the Andrea Doria and the MS Stockholm; the destruction of the USS San Diego; the wreck of the U-869; and other topics are also covered.

== History and organization ==
The foundation that operates the museum is a non-profit, and it is staffed entirely by volunteers. It features a research library and has scanned a wide array of documents on shipwrecks, including old records of the United States Life-Saving Service and Coast Guard. Their website includes a shipwreck database with all of the information gleaned on historic shipwrecks in the area, a map of artificial reefs, and a map of notable shipwrecks and their locations.

When the museum opened in 2007, it largely consisted of the personal collection of president Deborah Whitcraft. Whitcraft had been the owner of the Triton Divers dive shop and active in the diving community, giving her access to salvage and other artifacts from shipwrecks. Since then, donations and acquisitions have expanded the material on display.

The museum received a donation of two historic wooden sailboats in 2016 of the kind once used for cargo transport and fishing in 19th century New Jersey.

== Gallery ==
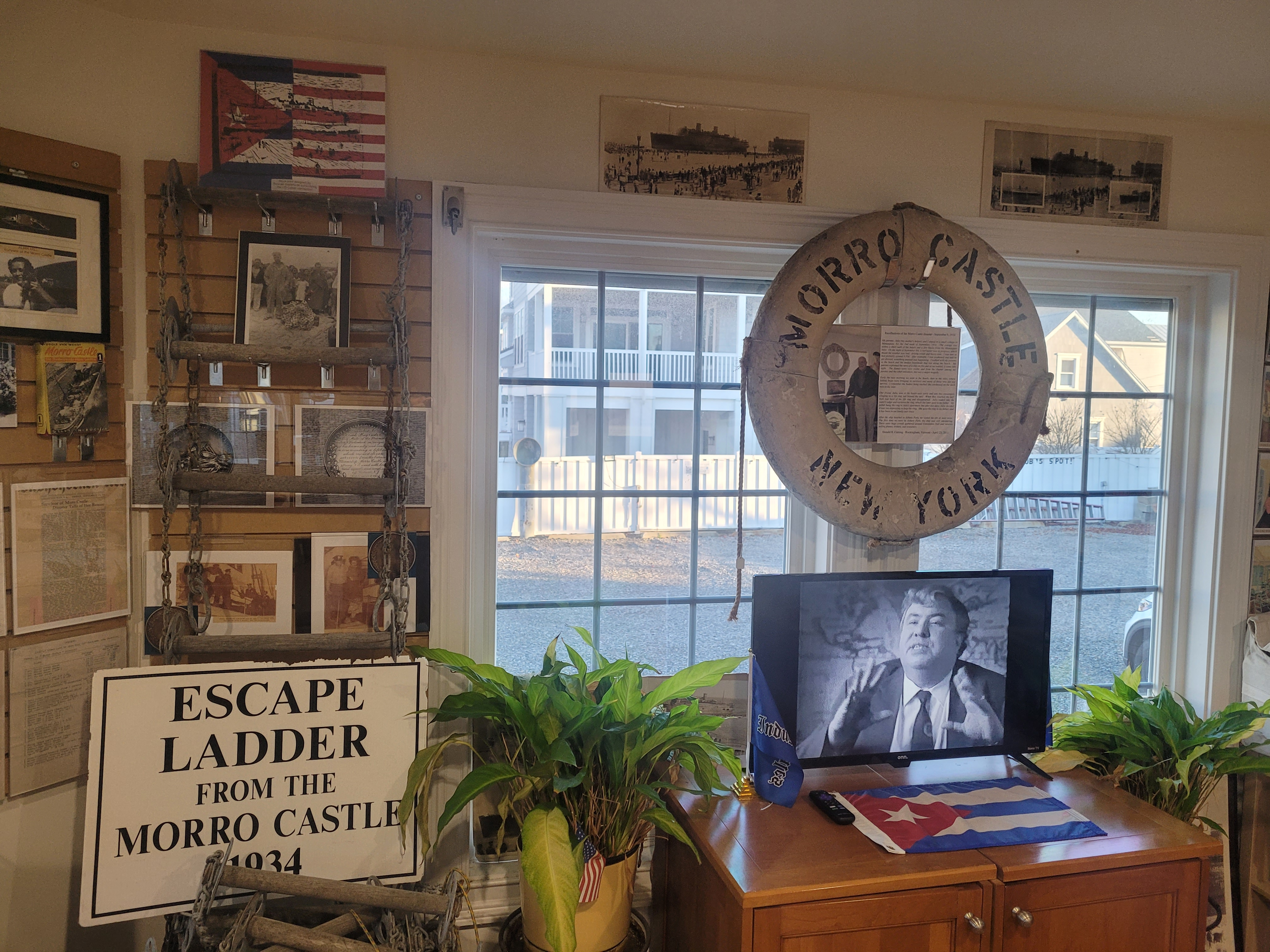
A side of the room dedicated to the Morro Castle disaster

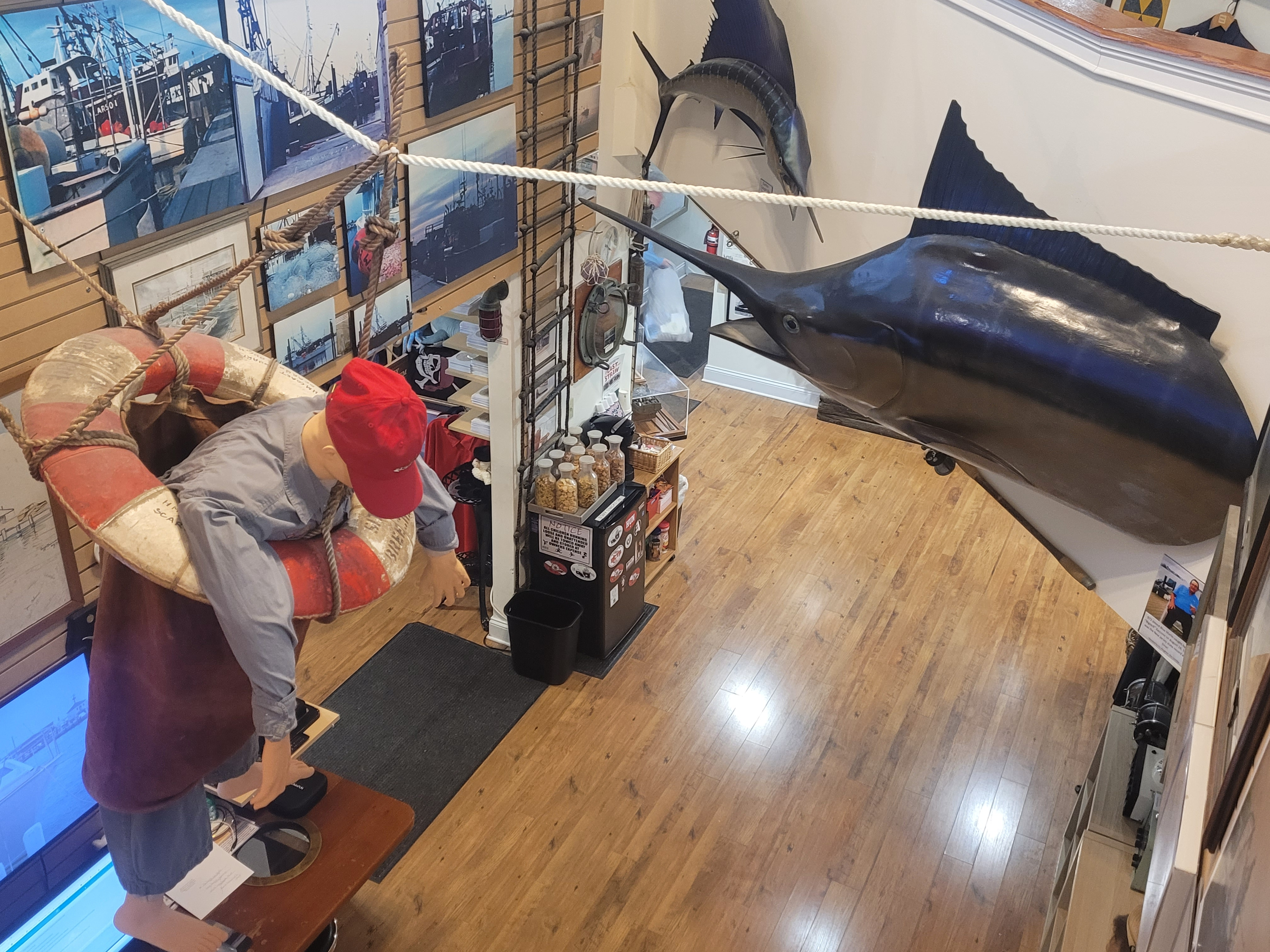
The 1st floor, seen looking down from the 2nd floor

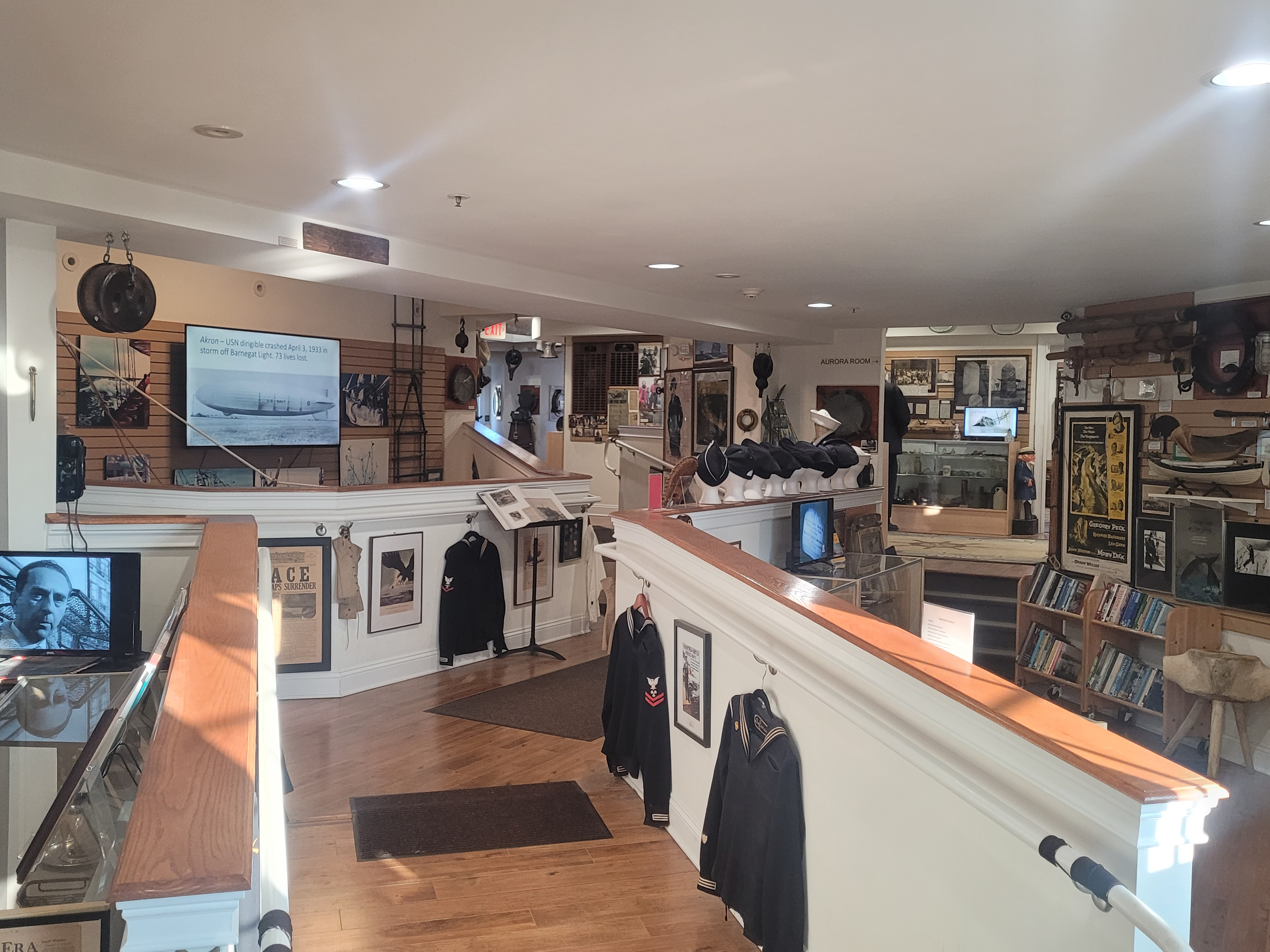
Interior, November 2024

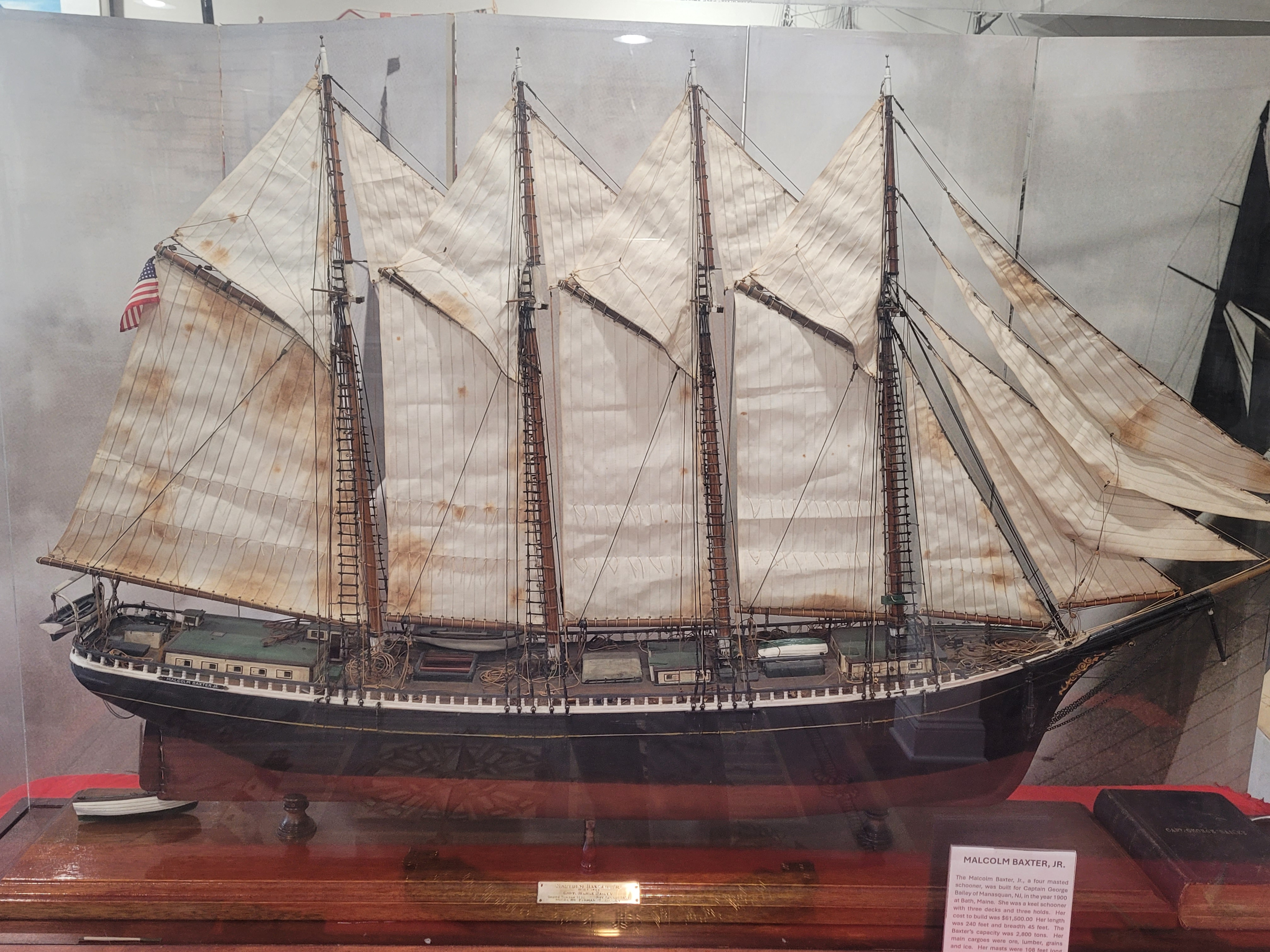
A model of the Malcolm Baxter, Jr.

== See also ==
- Tuckerton Seaport
