= Tuckerton, New Jersey =

Borough in Ocean County, New Jersey, US

- Borough
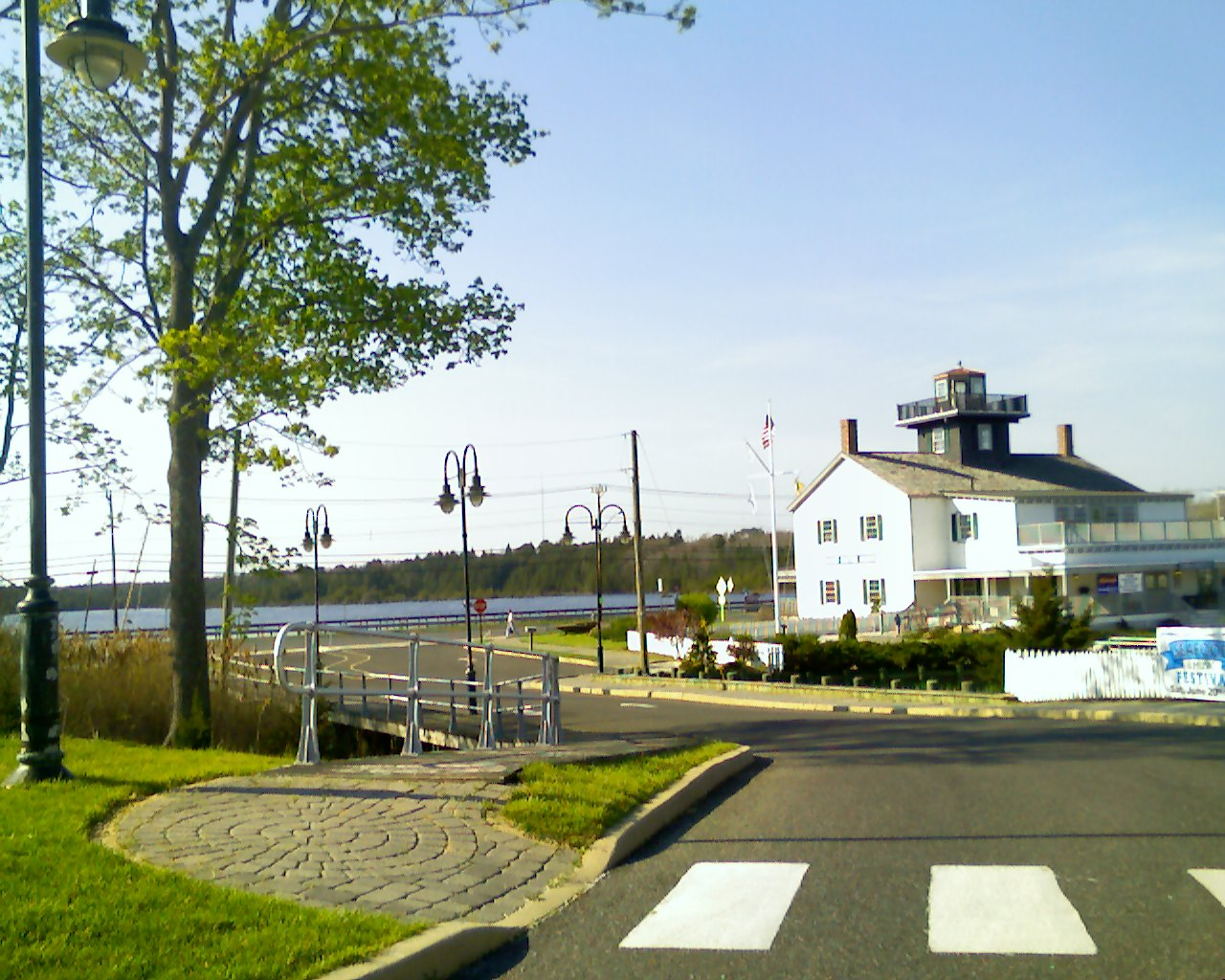
- The Tuckerton Seaport maritime museum

- Seal

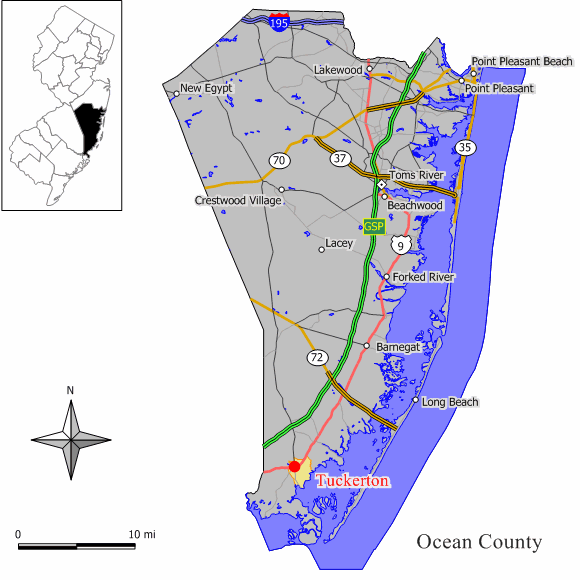
- Map of Tuckerton in Ocean County. Inset: Location of Ocean County highlighted in the State of New Jersey.

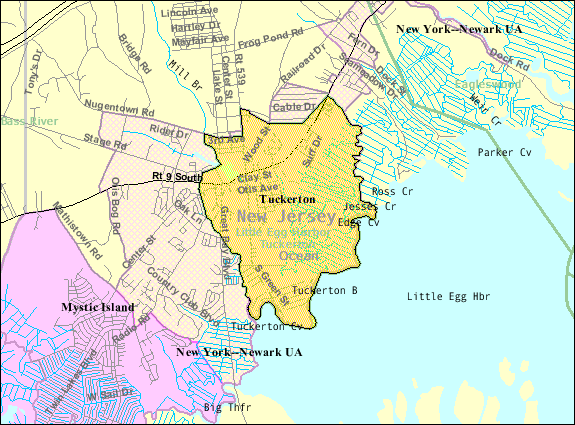
- Census Bureau map of Tuckerton, New Jersey

- Location in Ocean County Location in New Jersey Location in the United States
- Coordinates: 39.592197°N 74.333079°W
- Country: United States
- State: New Jersey
- County: Ocean
- Incorporated: February 18, 1901
- Named for: Ebenezer Tucker

Government
  - Type: Borough
  - Body: Borough Council
  - Mayor: Susan R. Marshall (R, term ends December 31, 2026)
  - Administrator: Jenny Gleghorn
  - Municipal clerk: Jenny Gleghorn

Area
  - Total: 3.81 sq mi (9.87 km^{2})
  - Land: 3.36 sq mi (8.71 km^{2})
  - Water: 0.45 sq mi (1.16 km^{2}) 11.76%
  - Rank: 304th of 565 in state 16th of 33 in county
- Elevation: 0 ft (0 m)

Population (2020)
  - Total: 3,577
  - Estimate (2023): 3,681
  - Rank: 427th of 565 in state 17th of 33 in county
  - Density: 1,063.8/sq mi (410.7/km^{2})
  - Rank: 375th of 565 in state 18th of 33 in county
- Time zone: UTC−05:00 (Eastern (EST))
  - Summer (DST): UTC−04:00 (Eastern (EDT))
- ZIP Code: 08087
- Area code: 609 Exchanges: 294, 296, 812
- FIPS code: 3402974210
- GNIS feature ID: 885422
- Website: www.tuckertonborough.com

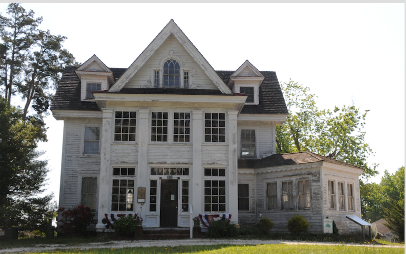
The Bartlett-Rockhill-Bartlett House

Tuckerton is a borough situated on the Jersey Shore, within Ocean County in the U.S. state of New Jersey. As of the 2020 United States census, the borough's population was 3,577, its highest decennial count ever and an increase of 230 (+6.9%) from the 3,347 recorded at the 2010 census, which in turn had reflected a decline of 170 (−4.8%) from the 3,517 counted in the 2000 census.

Tuckerton was incorporated as a borough by an act of the New Jersey Legislature on February 18, 1901, from portions of Little Egg Harbor Township.

The borough is surrounded by Little Egg Harbor Township, but is politically independent. Because Tuckerton and Little Egg Harbor share the same 08087 ZIP code and Little Egg Harbor has no true "downtown" area, many refer to Little Egg Harbor and surrounding suburbs as "Tuckerton". They also share the same school district Pinelands Regional School District, from 7th to Senior years.

Tuckerton is home to the Tuckerton Seaport, a working maritime museum and village.

== History ==
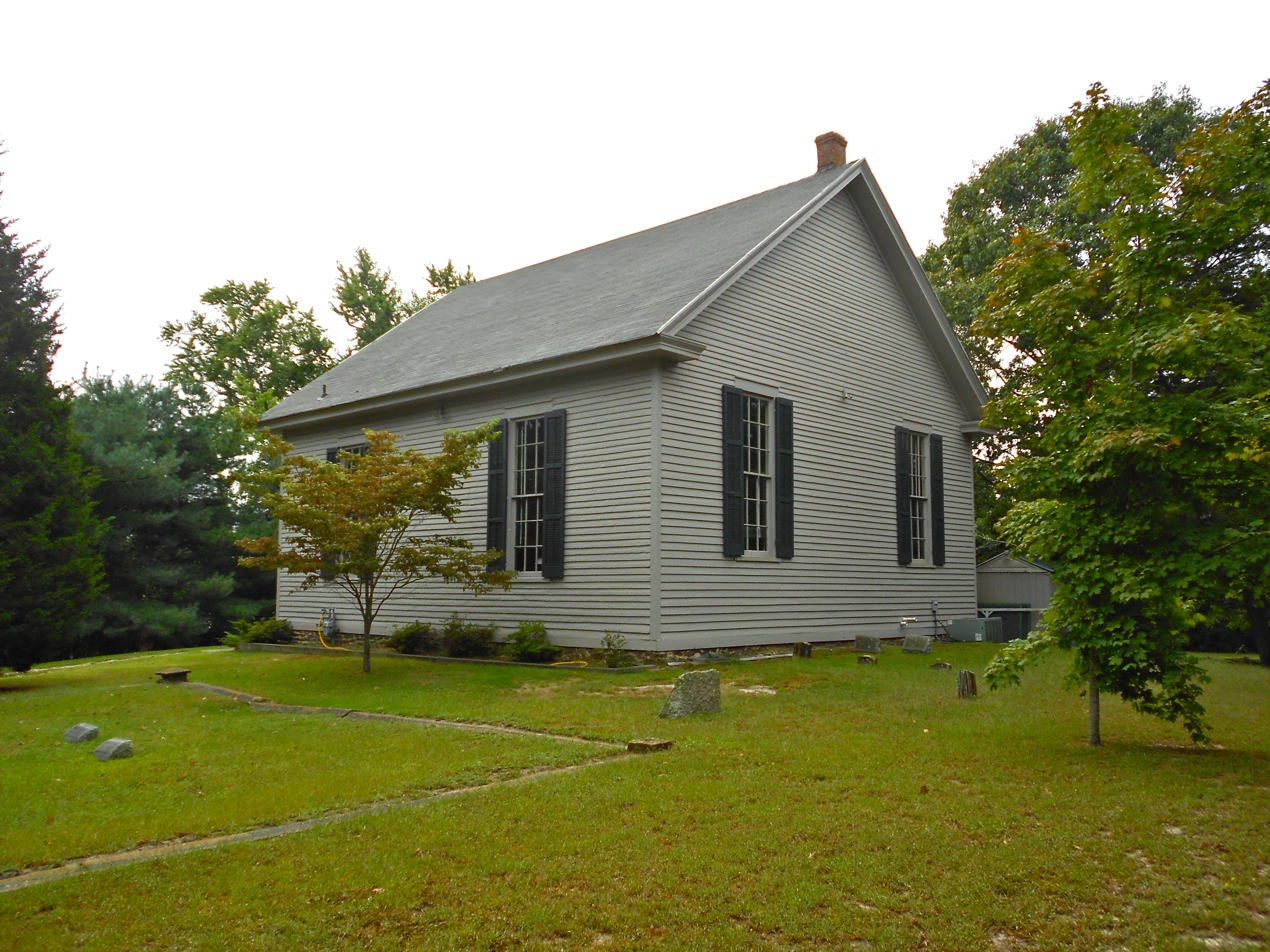
The Little Egg Harbor Friends Meeting House, built in 1863

The area that is now Tuckerton was settled in 1698. Some of the early settlers were Andrews, Falkinburgs, Shourds, Ongs, Willets and Osborns. Edward Andrews, settled on the east side of Pohatcong Creek; his brother, Mordecai Andrews settled on the west side of the same creek. Edward, tired of going to Mount Holly Township with his grain, constructed a cedar log grist mill on the site of a dam built by beavers at the mouth of what is known as Tuckerton Creek. He built the grist mill in 1704, and it still stands to this day.

Tuckerton became a Port of Entry of the United States, but not the third port as is commonly believed. The community was named for founder Ebenezer Tucker (1758–1845), who was appointed Collector, his commission bearing the date March 21, 1791, signed by George Washington and Thomas Jefferson. Six years later, Tuckerton became a post-town with Reuben Tucker as its first postmaster.

Former names of the town included "Andrew Mills", "Middle-of-the-Shore", "Clamtown", "Quakertown", and "Fishtown". In March 1789, Ebenezer Tucker hosted a feast at the then-named Clamtown for the residents, at which time they officially changed the name to Tuckerton.

In 1816, Isaac Jenkins established the first stage line between Tuckerton and Philadelphia, making one trip a week, each trip taking two days to travel each way. John D. Thompson bought the line in 1828 and ran the stages each way in a day and carried the mail. The stages and vessels were the only public conveyances to the cities until the Tuckerton Railroad was built in 1871.

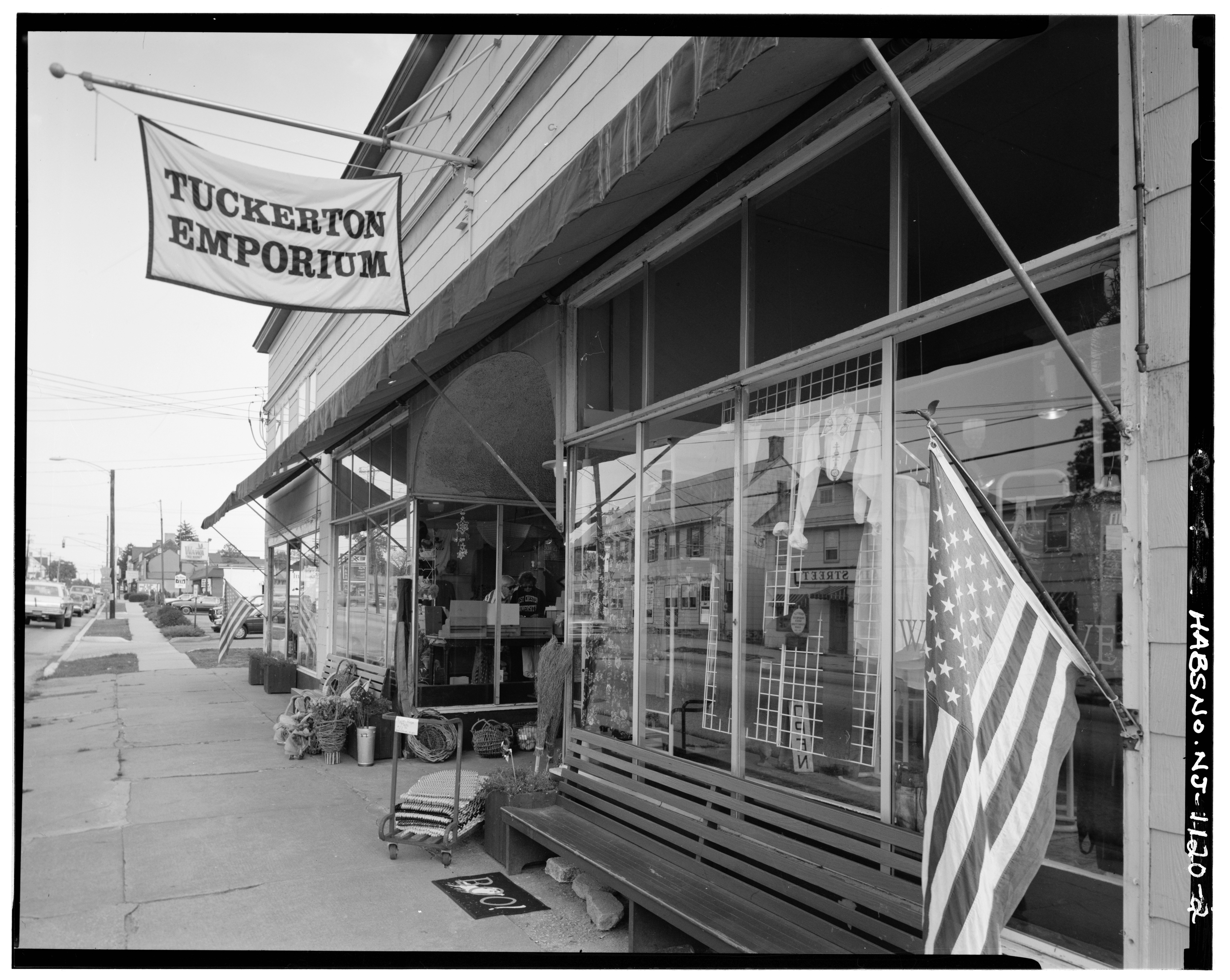
The Tuckerton Emporium on Main Street, originally opened as Gerber's department store.

What was probably New Jersey's first summer resort was on Tucker's Island offshore from Little Egg Harbor. The island sported boarding houses, private cottages, and a school. In 1848 a Lighthouse was erected there, with Eben Rider as its first lightkeeper. In 1869 the Little Egg Harbor Lifesaving's Station was constructed there. Also known as Sea Haven, the island contained two hotels. The island was wiped away in a storm, including its lighthouse, which fell into the sea. At the Tuckerton Seaport Museum, a re-created lighthouse has been built as well as other re-created buildings that were on Tuckers Island. In the lighthouse, there are several wall-mounted pictures showing the instant that the original lighthouse fell into the sea. The original island remains underwater.

The area surrounding present-day Tuckerton was part of Burlington County until 1891 when it joined with Ocean County. Tuckerton was established in March 1901, with its first mayor being Frank R. Austin.

By the turn of the 1800s, Tuckerton was home to a robust downtown area of shops, boarding houses, and hotels. Around 1800, Ebenezer Tucker built the "Union House" on the corner of Main Street & Green Street, which served as a post office, stagecoach stop, and lodge. The Union House was later known as the "Carlton House", which operated as an inn and tavern until it was destroyed by fire in 1964. The "Everett House" was built in the 1870s as a first-class temperance hotel to serve railroad passengers; the building, on Main Street between Green Street and Water Street, was demolished by the mid-20th Century. The Lakeside Hotel, situated on Main Street next to Lake Pohatcong, operated well into the 20th Century before its closure and demolition; a plaque commemorating World War I veterans on the side of the building was moved to its current site in Greenwood Cemetery.

The Tuckerton Methodist Episcopal Church was originally established in 1797. In 1868, the congregation broke ground on an elaborate Colonial-style church building featuring a slate-covered steeple, forged stained glass windows, a town clock, bell, and pipe organ. The building was constructed by shipwrights, as the boro was a bustling shipping and fishing village at the time.

In 1921, Reuben Gerber opened Gerber's Department Store on Main Street. The store's art deco interior was modeled after the Macy's Herald Square flagship store in New York City. Gerber's served as Tuckerton's main general store and was an authorized dealership for early Ford vehicles. The building remains and is currently known as the "Tuckerton Emporium", which houses a consortium of local vendors.

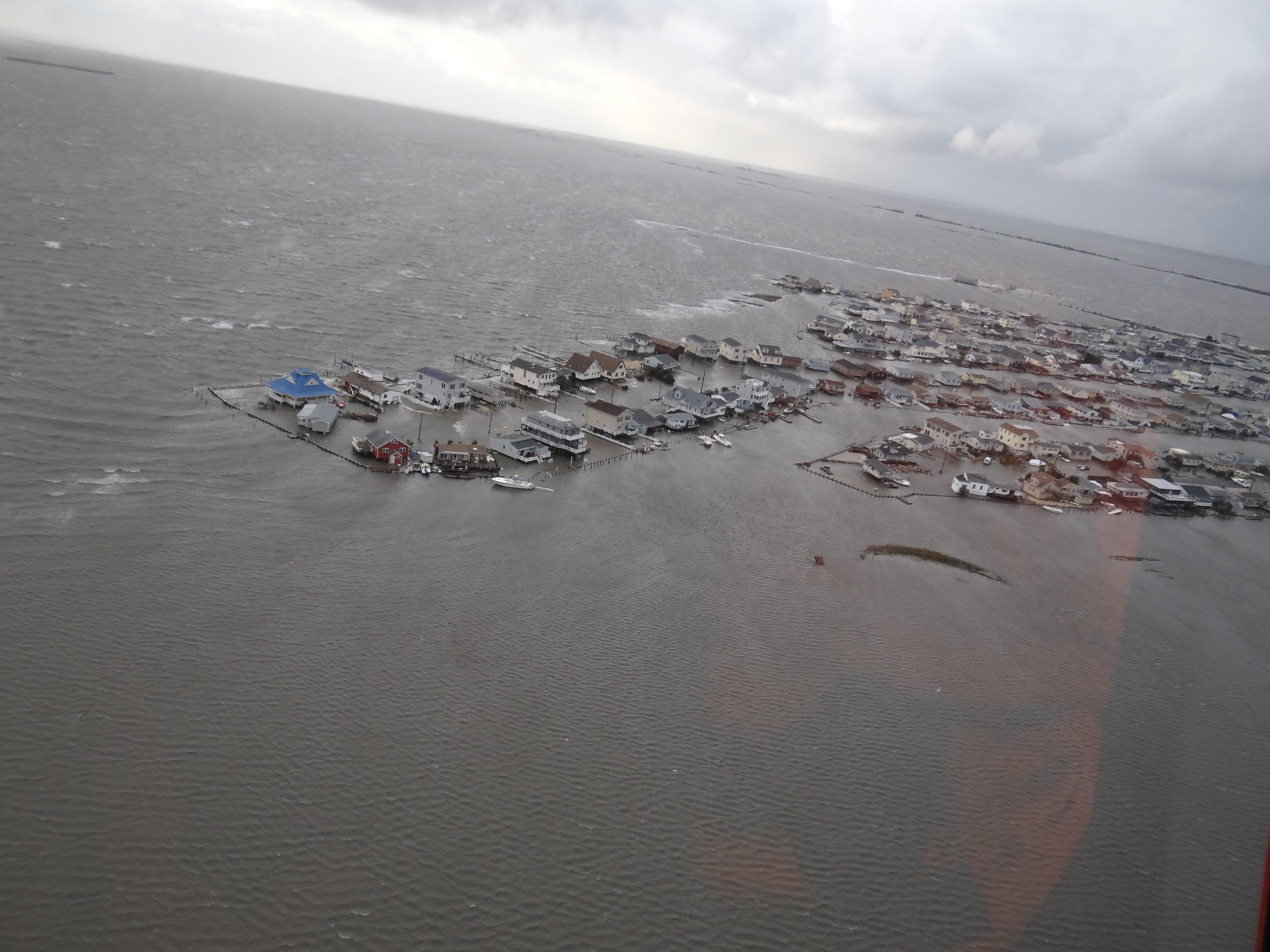
Flooding in Tuckerton Beach following Superstorm Sandy on October 30, 2012.

On May 7, 1979, a large wind-driven fire destroyed the century-old Tuckerton United Methodist Church, two stores, and several homes on Main Street, leaving 23 people homeless. The conflagration started in the Tuckerton Variety Store on 25 W. Main Street and spread to a vacant storefront and two second-floor apartments next door; 20-mph sea breeze winds carried embers 200 yards to the church, which quickly burned out of control. The embers also ignited fires in five homes on N. Green Street and several brush fires, all of which were quickly extinguished. Eighteen fire departments from Ocean and Burlington counties responded to the blaze.

Tuckerton received extensive damage after Superstorm Sandy struck the borough on October 28, 2012. Almost 300 homes suffered extensive damage, while 32 homes were completely destroyed. Floodwaters also ravaged businesses along South Green Street and flooded some buildings in the Tuckerton Seaport.

== Geography ==
According to the United States Census Bureau, the borough had a total area of 3.81 square miles (9.87 km^{2}), including 3.36 square miles (8.71 km^{2}) of land and 0.45 square miles (1.16 km^{2}) of water (11.76%).

The borough borders the Ocean County municipality of Little Egg Harbor Township.

=== Climate ===
The climate in this area is characterized by hot, humid summers and generally mild to cool winters. According to the Köppen Climate Classification system, Tuckerton has a humid subtropical climate, abbreviated "Cfa" on climate maps.

== Demographics ==
Historical population
Census	Pop.	Note	%±
1910	1,268		—
1920	1,106		−12.8%
1930	1,429		29.2%
1940	1,320		−7.6%
1950	1,332		0.9%
1960	1,536		15.3%
1970	1,926		25.4%
1980	2,472		28.3%
1990	3,048		23.3%
2000	3,517		15.4%
2010	3,347		−4.8%
2020	3,577		6.9%
2023 (est.)	3,681	▲	2.9%
Population sources: 1910–2000; 1910–1920 1910 1910–1930; 1940–2000 2000; 2010 2020

=== 2020 census ===
As of the 2020 census, Tuckerton had a population of 3,577. The median age was 46.2 years. 16.9% of residents were under the age of 18 and 21.3% of residents were 65 years of age or older. For every 100 females there were 99.7 males, and for every 100 females age 18 and over there were 97.0 males age 18 and over.

100.0% of residents lived in urban areas, while 0.0% lived in rural areas.

There were 1,574 households in Tuckerton, of which 23.5% had children under the age of 18 living in them. Of all households, 42.4% were married-couple households, 22.5% were households with a male householder and no spouse or partner present, and 26.1% were households with a female householder and no spouse or partner present. About 29.7% of all households were made up of individuals and 14.1% had someone living alone who was 65 years of age or older.

There were 2,110 housing units, of which 25.4% were vacant. The homeowner vacancy rate was 3.9% and the rental vacancy rate was 8.3%.

Racial composition as of the 2020 census
Race	Number	Percent
White	3,143	87.9%
Black or African American	41	1.1%
American Indian and Alaska Native	5	0.1%
Asian	40	1.1%
Native Hawaiian and Other Pacific Islander	3	0.1%
Some other race	117	3.3%
Two or more races	228	6.4%
Hispanic or Latino (of any race)	304	8.5%

=== 2010 census ===
The 2010 United States census counted 3,347 people, 1,396 households, and 873 families in the borough. The population density was 995.1 inhabitants per square mile (384.2/km^{2}). There were 1,902 housing units at an average density of 565.5 per square mile (218.3/km^{2}). The racial makeup was 93.79% (3,139) White, 0.75% (25) Black or African American, 0.09% (3) Native American, 1.05% (35) Asian, 0.00% (0) Pacific Islander, 2.06% (69) from other races, and 2.27% (76) from two or more races. Hispanic or Latino of any race were 6.07% (203) of the population.

Of the 1,396 households, 24.6% had children under the age of 18; 45.8% were married couples living together; 11.6% had a female householder with no husband present and 37.5% were non-families. Of all households, 31.1% were made up of individuals and 15.7% had someone living alone who was 65 years of age or older. The average household size was 2.39 and the average family size was 2.99.

21.2% of the population were under the age of 18, 8.0% from 18 to 24, 23.9% from 25 to 44, 29.4% from 45 to 64, and 17.6% who were 65 years of age or older. The median age was 42.5 years. For every 100 females, the population had 99.0 males. For every 100 females ages 18 and older there were 93.1 males.

The Census Bureau's 2006–2010 American Community Survey showed that (in 2010 inflation-adjusted dollars) median household income was $53,209 (with a margin of error of +/− $5,943) and the median family income was $61,677 (+/− $10,244). Males had a median income of $50,139 (+/− $5,122) versus $43,963 (+/− $14,203) for females. The per capita income for the borough was $24,974 (+/− $3,410). About 6.7% of families and 10.3% of the population were below the poverty line, including 20.8% of those under age 18 and 9.2% of those age 65 or over.

=== 2000 census ===
As of the 2000 United States census there were 3,517 people, 1,477 households, and 921 families residing in the borough. The population density was 961.7 inhabitants per square mile (371.3/km^{2}). There were 1,971 housing units at an average density of 539.0 per square mile (208.1/km^{2}). The racial makeup of the borough was 96.90% White, 0.40% African American, 0.28% Native American, 0.54% Asian, 0.54% from other races, and 1.34% from two or more races. Hispanic or Latino of any race were 3.10% of the population.

There were 1,477 households, out of which 28.1% had children under the age of 18 living with them, 50.0% were married couples living together, 8.9% had a female householder with no husband present, and 37.6% were non-families. 31.6% of all households were made up of individuals, and 15.5% had someone living alone who was 65 years of age or older. The average household size was 2.38 and the average family size was 3.02.

In the borough the population was spread out, with 23.0% under the age of 18, 8.0% from 18 to 24, 29.1% from 25 to 44, 23.0% from 45 to 64, and 16.8% who were 65 years of age or older. The median age was 39 years. For every 100 females, there were 98.9 males. For every 100 females age 18 and over, there were 94.1 males.

The median income for a household in the borough was $40,042, and the median income for a family was $49,528. Males had a median income of $35,799 versus $30,583 for females. The per capita income for the borough was $20,118. About 5.9% of families and 7.9% of the population were below the poverty line, including 13.7% of those under age 18 and 10.2% of those age 65 or over.

== Arts and culture ==
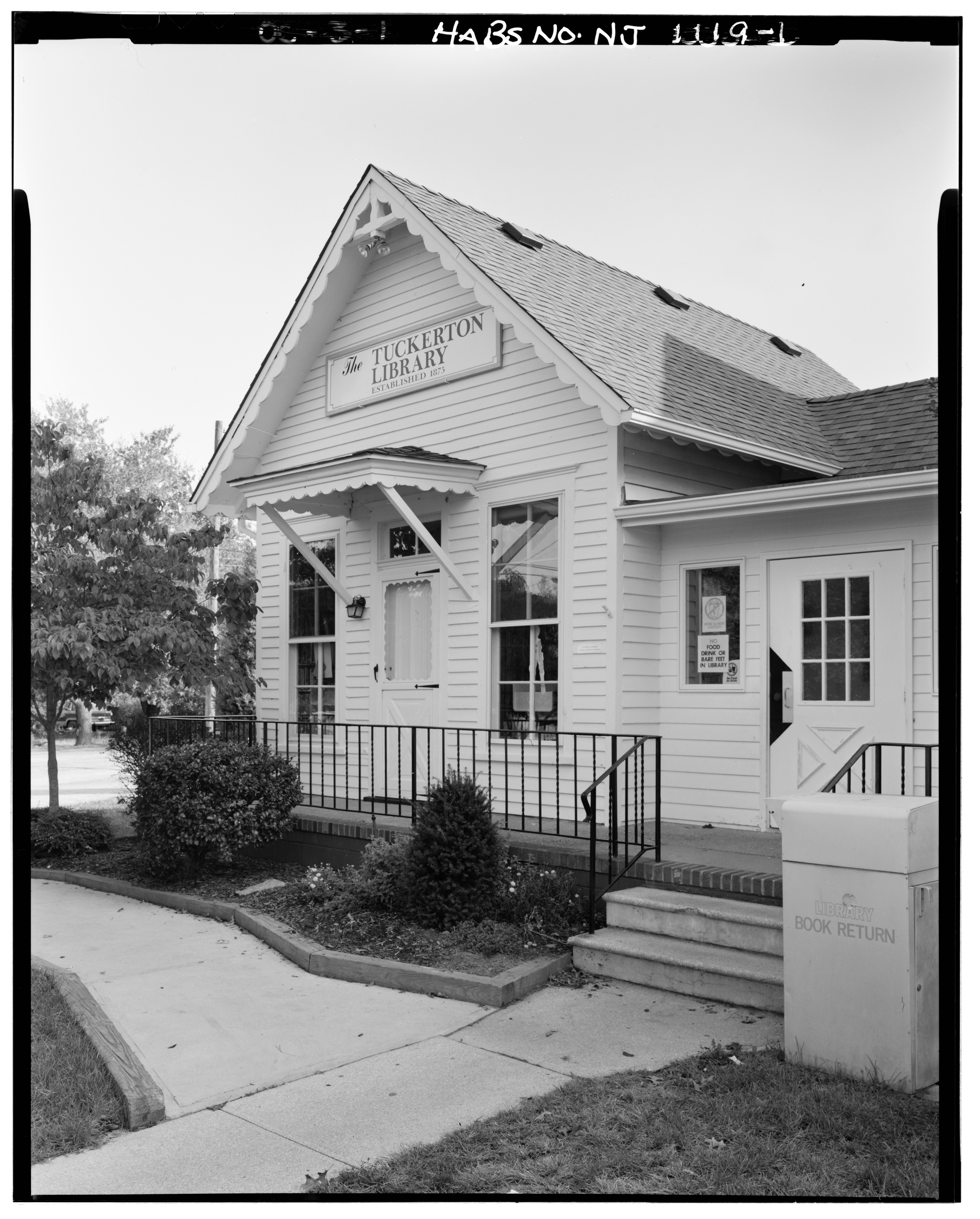
The Tuckerton branch of the Ocean County Library

The Tuckerton Seaport, which is located in the center of town on Main Street, is a working maritime museum and village, which features several re-created historic buildings and has been a major attraction since its May 2000 opening.

Along Main Street in Tuckerton are several shops and stores. South of County Route 539, Main Street is bounded by Lake Pohatcong, which features a duck decoy-shaped billboard advertising the annual Ocean County Decoy and Gunning Show held in September at nearby Tip Seaman Park that began in 1982 and draws as many as 20,000 visitors. During the Holidays, the duck is replaced with a Christmas tree. In 1995, a boardwalk was installed along the side of the road overhanging the lake.

== Government ==
=== Local government ===
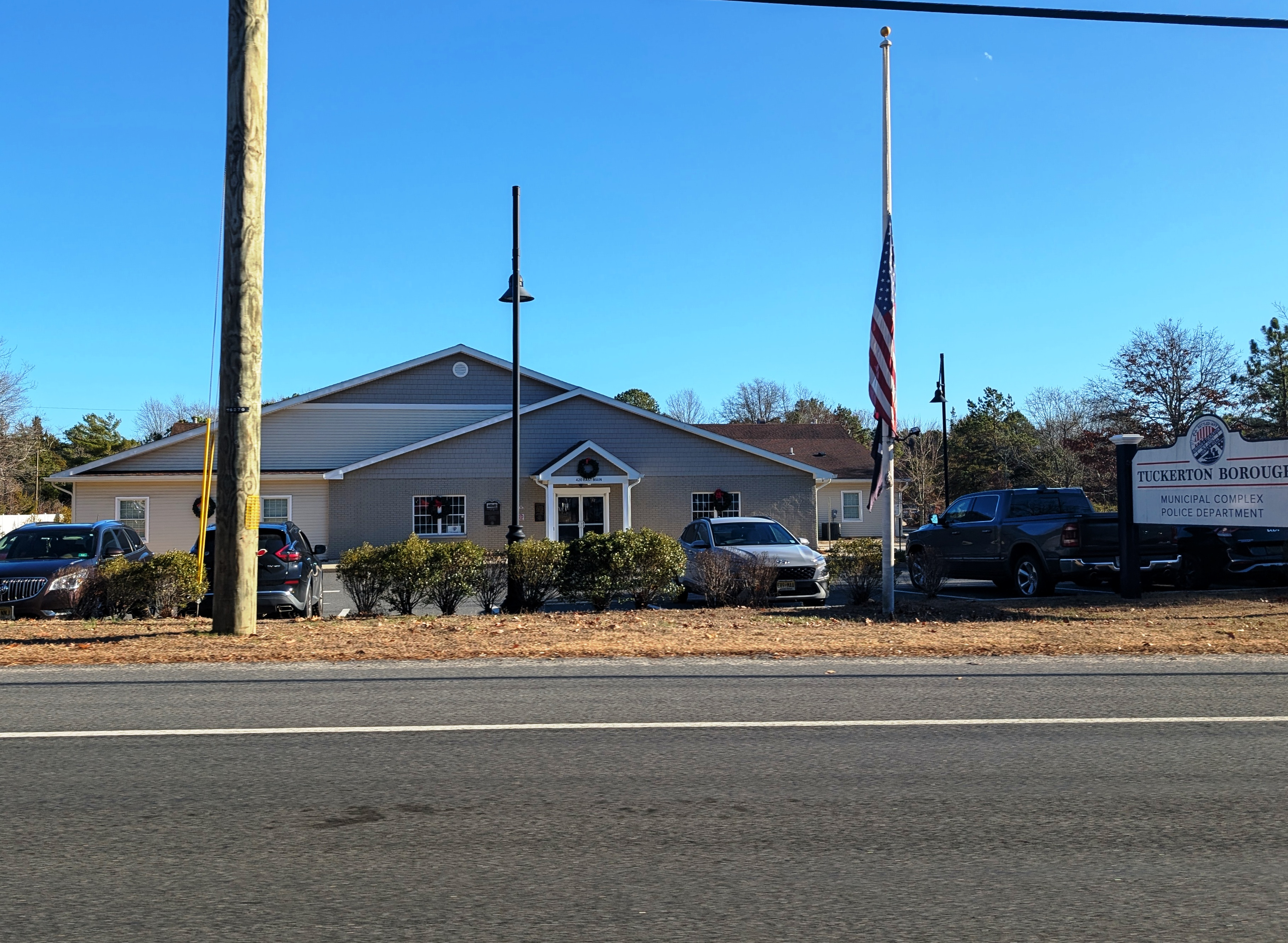
Tuckerton Borough Municipal Complex

Tuckerton is governed under the borough form of New Jersey municipal government, which is used in 218 municipalities (of the 564) statewide, making it the most common form of government in New Jersey. The governing body is comprised of the mayor and the borough council, with all positions elected at-large on a partisan basis as part of the November general election. The mayor is elected directly by the voters to a four-year term of office. The borough council includes six members elected to serve three-year terms on a staggered basis, with two seats coming up for election each year in a three-year cycle. The borough form of government used by Tuckerton is a "weak mayor / strong council" government in which council members act as the legislative body with the mayor presiding at meetings and voting only in the event of a tie. The mayor can veto ordinances subject to an override by a two-thirds majority vote of the council. The mayor makes committee and liaison assignments for council members, and most appointments are made by the mayor with the advice and consent of the council.

As of 2022, the mayor of the Borough of Tuckerton is Republican Susan R. Marshall, whose term of office ends December 31, 2022. Members of the Borough Council are Council President Samuel C. Colangelo (R, 2022), Frank D'Amore (R, 2024), Brian Martin (R, 2023), Ronald L. Peterson (R, 2024), Michael Santo (R, 2022), SuZanne L. Taylor (R, 2022) and Keith F. Vreeland Jr. (R, 2023).

In September 2015, the borough council appointed Keith Vreeland to fill the vacant seat expiring in December 2017 that had been held by James R. Edwards until his death. Vreeland served on an interim basis until the November 2015 general election, when voters elected him to fill the two years remaining of the term of office.

In January 2015, the borough council chose Michael Santo to fill the council seat expiring in December 2016 that had been vacated by Sue Marshall when she took office as mayor. Santo was elected in the November 2015 general election to serve the one year remaining.

=== Federal, state and county representation ===
Tuckerton is located in the 2nd Congressional District and is part of New Jersey's 9th state legislative district.

For the 119th United States Congress, New Jersey's 2nd congressional district is represented by Jeff Van Drew (R, Dennis Township). New Jersey is represented in the United States Senate by Democrats Cory Booker (Newark, term ends 2027) and Andy Kim (Moorestown, term ends 2031).

For the 2026–2027 session, the 9th legislative district of the New Jersey Legislature is represented in the State Senate by Carmen Amato (R, Berkeley Township) and in the General Assembly by Greg Myhre (R, Stafford Township) and Brian E. Rumpf (R, Little Egg Harbor Township).

Ocean County is governed by a Board of County Commissioners composed of five members who are elected on an at-large basis in partisan elections and serving staggered three-year terms of office, with either one or two seats coming up for election each year as part of the November general election. At an annual reorganization held in the beginning of January, the board chooses a director and a deputy director from among its members. As of 2025, Ocean County's Commissioners (with party affiliation, term-end year and residence) are:

John P. Kelly (R, 2025, Eagleswood Township), Virginia E. Haines (R, 2025, Toms River), Robert Arace (R, Manchester Township, 2027) Jennifer Bacchione (R, Berkeley Township, 2027) and Frank Sadeghi (R, 2026, Toms River).

Constitutional officers elected on a countywide basis are: Clerk Scott M. Colabella (R, 2025, Barnegat Light), Sheriff Michael G. Mastronardy (R, 2025; Toms River) and Surrogate Jeffrey Moran (R, 2028, Beachwood).

=== Politics ===
As of March 2011, there were a total of 2,349 registered voters in Tuckerton, of which 370 (15.8%) were registered as Democrats, 836 (35.6%) were registered as Republicans and 1,141 (48.6%) were registered as Unaffiliated. There were 2 voters registered as either Libertarians or Greens. Among the borough's 2010 Census population, 70.2% (vs. 63.2% in Ocean County) were registered to vote, including 89.0% of those ages 18 and over (vs. 82.6% countywide).

Gubernatorial election results for Tuckerton
Year	Republican		Democratic		Third party(ies)	
Year	No.	%	No.	%	No.	%
2025	1,003	65.26%	525	34.16%	9	0.59%
2021	857	70.71%	344	28.38%	11	0.91%
2017	521	59.41%	334	38.08%	22	2.51%
2013	673	75.28%	212	23.71%	9	1.01%
2009	656	61.19%	327	30.50%	89	8.30%
2005	506	55.67%	346	38.06%	57	6.27%

In the 2012 presidential election, Republican Mitt Romney received 54.5% of the vote (745 cast), ahead of Democrat Barack Obama with 44.2% (604 votes), and other candidates with 1.3% (18 votes), among the 1,372 ballots cast by the borough's 2,418 registered voters (5 ballots were spoiled), for a turnout of 56.7%. In the 2008 presidential election, Republican John McCain received 54.9% of the vote (886 cast), ahead of Democrat Barack Obama with 43.0% (694 votes) and other candidates with 1.5% (24 votes), among the 1,614 ballots cast by the borough's 2,417 registered voters, for a turnout of 66.8%. In the 2004 presidential election, Republican George W. Bush received 60.6% of the vote (912 ballots cast), outpolling Democrat John Kerry with 37.5% (565 votes) and other candidates with 1.1% (24 votes), among the 1,506 ballots cast by the borough's 2,243 registered voters, for a turnout percentage of 67.1.

Presidential Elections Results
Year	Republican	Democratic	Third Parties
2024	67.5% 1,298	30.6% 588	1.9% 29
2020	61.7% 1,175	36.2% 690	2.1% 30
2016	63.9% 970	30.7% 466	5.3% 81
2012	54.5% 745	44.2% 604	1.3% 18
2008	54.9% 886	43.0% 694	1.5% 24
2004	60.6% 912	37.5% 565	1.1% 24

In the 2013 gubernatorial election, Republican Chris Christie received 75.3% of the vote (673 cast), ahead of Democrat Barbara Buono with 23.7% (212 votes), and other candidates with 1.0% (9 votes), among the 914 ballots cast by the borough's 2,304 registered voters (20 ballots were spoiled), for a turnout of 39.7%. In the 2009 gubernatorial election, Republican Chris Christie received 60.1% of the vote (656 ballots cast), ahead of Democrat Jon Corzine with 30.0% (327 votes), Independent Chris Daggett with 6.5% (71 votes) and other candidates with 1.6% (18 votes), among the 1,091 ballots cast by the borough's 2,400 registered voters, yielding a 45.5% turnout.

United States Senate election results for Tuckerton1
Year	Republican		Democratic		Third party(ies)	
Year	No.	%	No.	%	No.	%
2024	1,178	64.98%	613	33.81%	22	1.21%
2018	819	63.54%	431	33.44%	39	3.03%
2012	689	53.95%	566	44.32%	22	1.72%
2006	567	59.56%	343	36.03%	42	4.41%

United States Senate election results for Tuckerton2
Year	Republican		Democratic		Third party(ies)	
Year	No.	%	No.	%	No.	%
2020	1,136	61.71%	668	36.28%	37	2.01%
2014	530	60.57%	328	37.49%	17	1.94%
2013	337	65.18%	173	33.46%	7	1.35%
2008	797	55.46%	610	42.45%	30	2.09%

== Education ==
Students in public school for pre-kindergarten through sixth grade are served by the Tuckerton School District at Tuckerton Elementary School. As of the 2020–21 school year, the district, comprised of one school, had an enrollment of 311 students and 32.0 classroom teachers (on an FTE basis), for a student–teacher ratio of 9.7:1.

Public school students in seventh through twelfth grades attend the schools of the Pinelands Regional School District, which also serves students from Bass River Township, Eagleswood Township and Little Egg Harbor Township. Schools in the district (with 2020–21 enrollment data from the National Center for Education Statistics) are Pinelands Regional Junior High School with 526 students in grades 7-8 and Pinelands Regional High School with 1,036 students in grades 9-12. The district's board of education is comprised of nine members directly elected by the residents of the constituent municipalities to three-year terms on a staggered basis, with three seats up for election each year. Seats on the high school district's board of education are allocated based on the population of the constituent municipalities, with one seat allocated to Tuckerton.

== Media ==
Tuckerton is home to the tallest structure in New Jersey, a tower standing at 1,000 feet (300 m), which transmits Philadelphia Telemundo affiliate WWSI.

99.7 WBHX-FM is licensed to Tuckerton. The transmitter is located in Long Beach Island in Beach Haven. The station is heard up to the Toms River area, and as far south as Atlantic City. This station simulcasts "Fun 107" format from 107.1 WWZY in Long Branch.

Tuckerton is also a cable landing point of the submarine communication cable GlobeNet. The landing station for the decommissioned TAT-14 cable system sits atop the underground cable landing station built to cold-war specifications for the previously decommissioned TAT-3, TAT-4 and TAT-8.

== Transportation ==
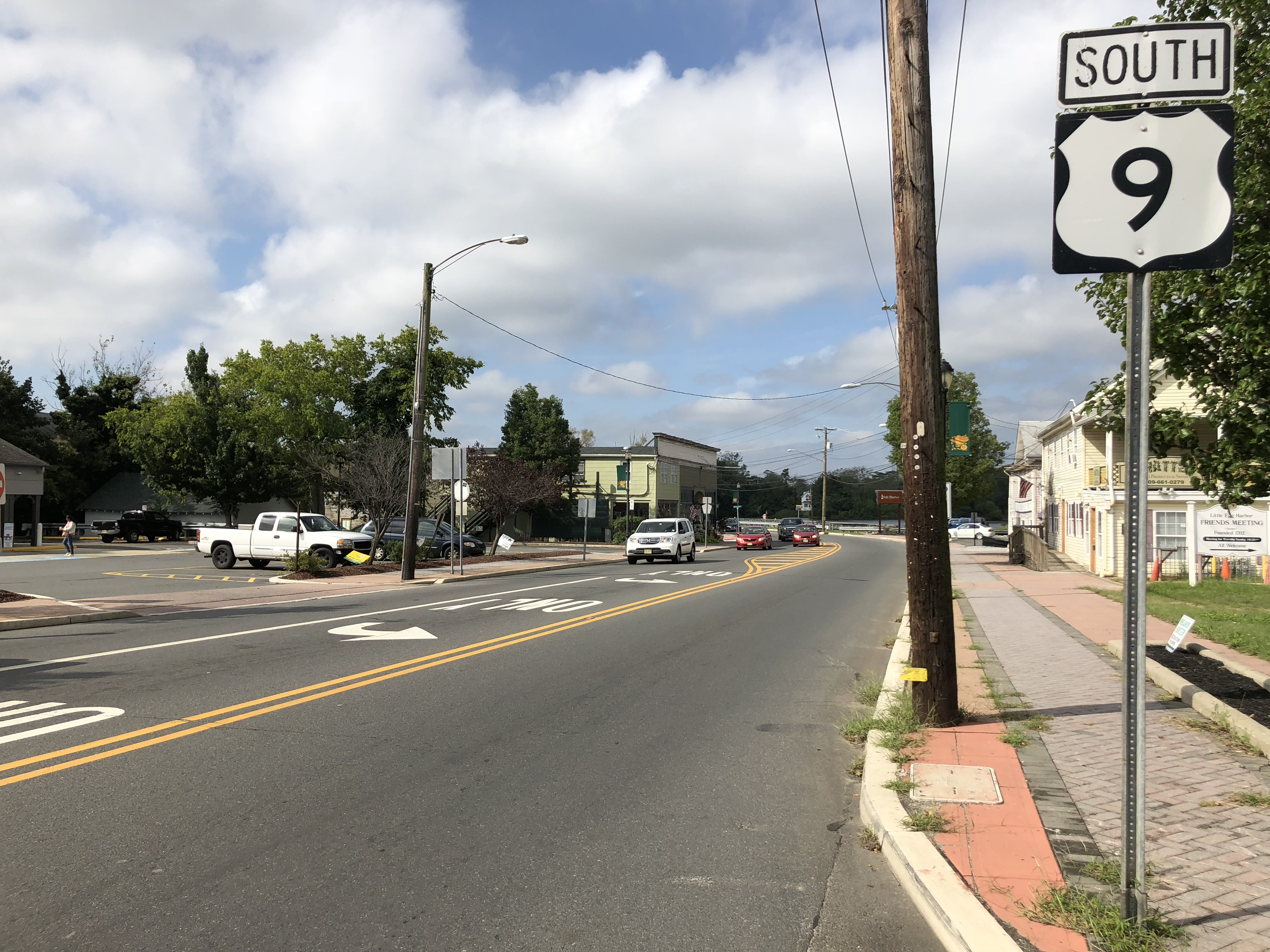
U.S. Route 9 southbound in Tuckerton

=== Roads and highways ===
As of May 2010, the borough had a total of 19.92 miles (32.06 km) of roadways, of which 12.23 miles (19.68 km) were maintained by the municipality, 5.69 miles (9.16 km) by Ocean County and 2.00 miles (3.22 km) by the New Jersey Department of Transportation.

U.S. Route 9 passes through the northern part of the town and connects with the southern end of CR 539.

The Garden State Parkway is accessible via Route 539 (Exit 58 in Little Egg Harbor) and US 9 (Exit 50 in Bass River).

=== Public transportation ===
NJ Transit provides bus service to Atlantic City on the 559 route.

Ocean Ride local service is provided on the OC6 Little Egg Harbor – Stafford route.

== Notable people ==
People who were born in, residents of, or otherwise closely associated with Tuckerton include:

- Ezra Baker (c. 1765, date of death unknown), U.S. Representative from New Jersey
- Mathilde Cottrelly (1851–1933), German-born stage actress, singer, producer and theater manager
- Thomas A. Mathis (1869–1958), Tuckerton councilman and political boss who served in the New Jersey Senate and was the Secretary of State of New Jersey from 1931 to 1941
- W. Steelman Mathis (1898–1981), politician who served in the New Jersey Senate from 1941 to 1942 and 1947 to 1966.
- Ebenezer Tucker (1758–1845), member of the United States House of Representatives from New Jersey from 1825 to 1829 who was the borough's namesake
