= Ken Lynch =

American actor (1910–1990)

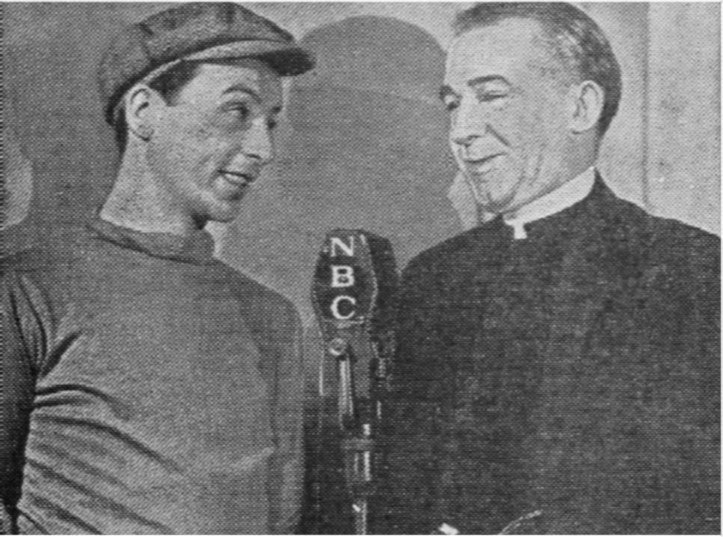
- Lynch (left) and Richard Gordon in the radio program The Bishop and the Gargoyle
- Born: Kenneth Englehart Lynch; July 15, 1910; Albany, New York, U.S.
- Died: February 13, 1990 (aged 79); Burbank, California, U.S.
- Occupation: Actor
- Years active: 1940–1983

Kenneth E. Lynch (July 15, 1910 – February 13, 1990) was an American radio, film, and television actor with more than 180 credits to his name. He was generally known for portraying law enforcement officers and detectives. He may have been best known for his starring role as "the Lieutenant" on Dumont detective series The Plainclothesman (1949–1954), on which his face was never seen, and for his co-starring role as Sergeant Grover on McCloud.

== Early life ==
Kenneth Englehart Lynch was born on July 15, 1910, in Albany, New York, the only child of Bertha Dietzel and Charles William Lynch. His father was a native of Woburn, Massachusetts, who started his career as a coffee salesman, and then became a creamery owner in Troy, New York. His mother was from Yonkers, New York, a third generation German-American. His middle name was his maternal grandmother's maiden name.

== Career ==
Lynch made his acting career on radio series. In 1940, on The Bishop and the Gargoyle, he played the Gargoyle, an ex-convict who helped the Bishop solve crimes. From 1942 to 1946, he was the voice of Tank Tanker, the mechanic, who aides the title character in Hop Harrigan.

He had roles on three daytime radio soap operas. Lynch played Victor on Backstage Wife, Buck on Portia Faces Life, and Slim Stark on A Woman of America.

In 1950, Lynch starred in One Thousand Dollars Reward, a rare crime drama, where after the crime play had ended, the host would place a telephone call to a random listener, who would then try to solve the mystery. Lynch also appeared on the radio shows The Falcon, 21st Precinct, and Gunsmoke. Later, in 1952, he played both Christopher Gard and Steve Lacey in Cafe Istanbul on CBS radio.

From 1949 to 1954, Lynch starred in The Plainclothesman on the DuMont Television Network. In his role of the lieutenant on that program, he did not appear on camera, giving the impression that viewers saw things through his eyes. He appeared in numerous television series. He made three guest appearances on Perry Mason, including the role of Wallace Lang in "The Case of the Stuttering Bishop" in 1959, Robert Hayden in "The Case of the Irate Inventor" in 1960 and Customs Inspector Wendel in "The Case of the Floating Stones" in 1963. Some of the other series in which Lynch appeared are Peter Gunn, Zorro, Have Gun - Will Travel ("Fight at Adobe Wells"), Gunsmoke (“Bureaucrat”, "Born to Hang" & “The Patsy”), Checkmate ("The Cyanide Touch"), The Asphalt Jungle, Straightaway, The Honeymooners, The Fugitive, The Andy Griffith Show, The Dick Van Dyke Show, Blue Light, Adam-12, Star Trek ("The Devil in the Dark") Season 1, Episode 25 as Chief Engineer Vanderberg in 1967, Maverick, All In The Family (in the famous episode, "Archie in the Lockup", where he played Guard Callaghan), The Twilight Zone ("Mr. Denton on Doomsday"), The Rifleman, and The Wild Wild West. In 1960 Lynch appeared as Al Killmer in the TV western series Lawman in the episode titled "The Escape of Joe Killmer." He played The Freighter in S8 E26 "The Jarbo Pierce Story" on "Wagon Train", 1965.

Between 1972 and 1977, he made 16 guest appearances on McCloud, performing as a police sergeant and later a detective named Grover on the series. In September 1974, he appeared in the very first episode of the cult classic,Kolchak:The Night Stalker, playing a police captain.He previously appeared in 12 episodes of Gunsmoke, 10 episodes of The F.B.I., nine episodes of Bonanza, and six episodes in both The Virginian and Gomer Pyle, USMC. Among the feature films in which he appeared are I Married a Monster from Outer Space, North By Northwest, The Lawbreakers, Pork Chop Hill, Anatomy of a Murder and Tora! Tora! Tora!. He appeared in Battlestar Galactica as Dr Horning in episode 22, "Experiment in Terra" (1979). Lynch's last credited performance was in the role of Rear Admiral Talbot Gray in the 1983 seven-part miniseries The Winds of War.

== Flower business ==
Even though Lynch still had a very successful career as an actor by the 1970s, he began looking for another, more steady source of income. He explained in a 1975 newspaper interview: "In acting you just can't predict the jobs that will come along. If you could, you could budget." With such income uncertainty in mind as he grew older, Lynch bought a flower shop in North Hollywood a "few years" before the noted interview. He began studying floriculture, taking courses in the art of floral arranging and design, and then providing flowers for local weddings, receptions, and other events. According to Lynch, his many years of experience performing on decorated sets for movies and television series proved to be a benefit to him in his new business. "Actually," he observed, "servicing a wedding is like ordering flowers for a studio set".

== Death ==
Lynch died at age 79 from a virus on February 13, 1990, in Burbank, California. He was buried at the San Fernando Mission Cemetery in Mission Hills, Los Angeles.

== Filmography ==
=== Film ===
- When Willie Comes Marching Home (1950) - (uncredited)
- Run Silent, Run Deep (1958) – Frank (uncredited)
- Young and Wild (1958) – David Whitman
- The Bonnie Parker Story (1958) – Cook
- Man or Gun (1958) – Buckstorm Corley
- Voice in the Mirror (1958) – Frank, Bartender
- I Married a Monster from Outer Space (1958) – Dr. Wayne
- Unwed Mother (1958) – Ray Curtis
- Paratroop Command (1959) – Lieutenant Ed
- Pork Chop Hill (1959) – Major General Trudeau
- Anatomy of a Murder (1959) – Detective Sergeant James Durgo
- The Legend of Tom Dooley (1959) – Father
- North by Northwest (1959) – Officer Charlie
- The Dark at the Top of the Stairs (1960) – Harry Ralston
- Seven Ways from Sundown (1960) – Graves
- Portrait of a Mobster (1961) – Lieutenant D. Corbin
- The Honeymoon Machine (1961) – Captain James Angle
- Walk on the Wild Side (1962) – Frank Bonito
- Days of Wine and Roses (1962) – Proprietor (uncredited)
- Dead Ringer (1964) – Captain Johnson
- Apache Rifles (1964) – Hodges
- Dear Heart (1964) – The Masher
- Mister Buddwing (1966) – Dan
- Hotel (1967) – Joe Laswell
- P.J. (1968) – Thorson
- Never a Dull Moment (1968) – Police Lieutenant (uncredited)
- My Dog, the Thief (1969) – The Detective
- Tora! Tora! Tora! (1970) – Rear Admiral John H. Newton (uncredited)
- Across 110th Street (1972) – Tailor Shop Patrolman
- Bard Charleston Charlie (1973) – Sheriff Harve Koontz
- Willie Dynamite (1974) – Judge #1
- W (1974) – Guard

=== Television ===
- The Honeymooners (1956) "Trapped" as Police Officer
- Gunsmoke (1958) – Episode "The Patsy" as Cowboy Fly Ho
- Alfred Hitchcock Presents (1958) (Season 4 Episode 7: "Man with a Problem") as Police Lieutenant
- Perry Mason (1959) "The Case of the Stuttering Bishop" as Wallace Lang
- Bonanza (1960) (Season 1 Episode 22 "Blood on the Land") as Collier
- The Andy Griffith Show (1960) (Season 1 Episode 2 ( Manhunt) as Captain Barker state police
- The Andy Griffith Show (1960) (Season 2 Episode 18 ( Jailbreak ) as Mr. Horton state police
- Star Trek (1967) “The Devil in the Dark” as Chief Engineer Vanderberg
- The Invaders (1968) "Counterattack" as Police Lieutenant Hensen
- All in the Family (1971) "Archie in the Lock-Up" as Guard Callahan.
- All in the Family (1973) "Everybody Tells The Truth" as Bob the Repairman
