= Mathilde Cottrelly =

American singer and actress (1851–1933)

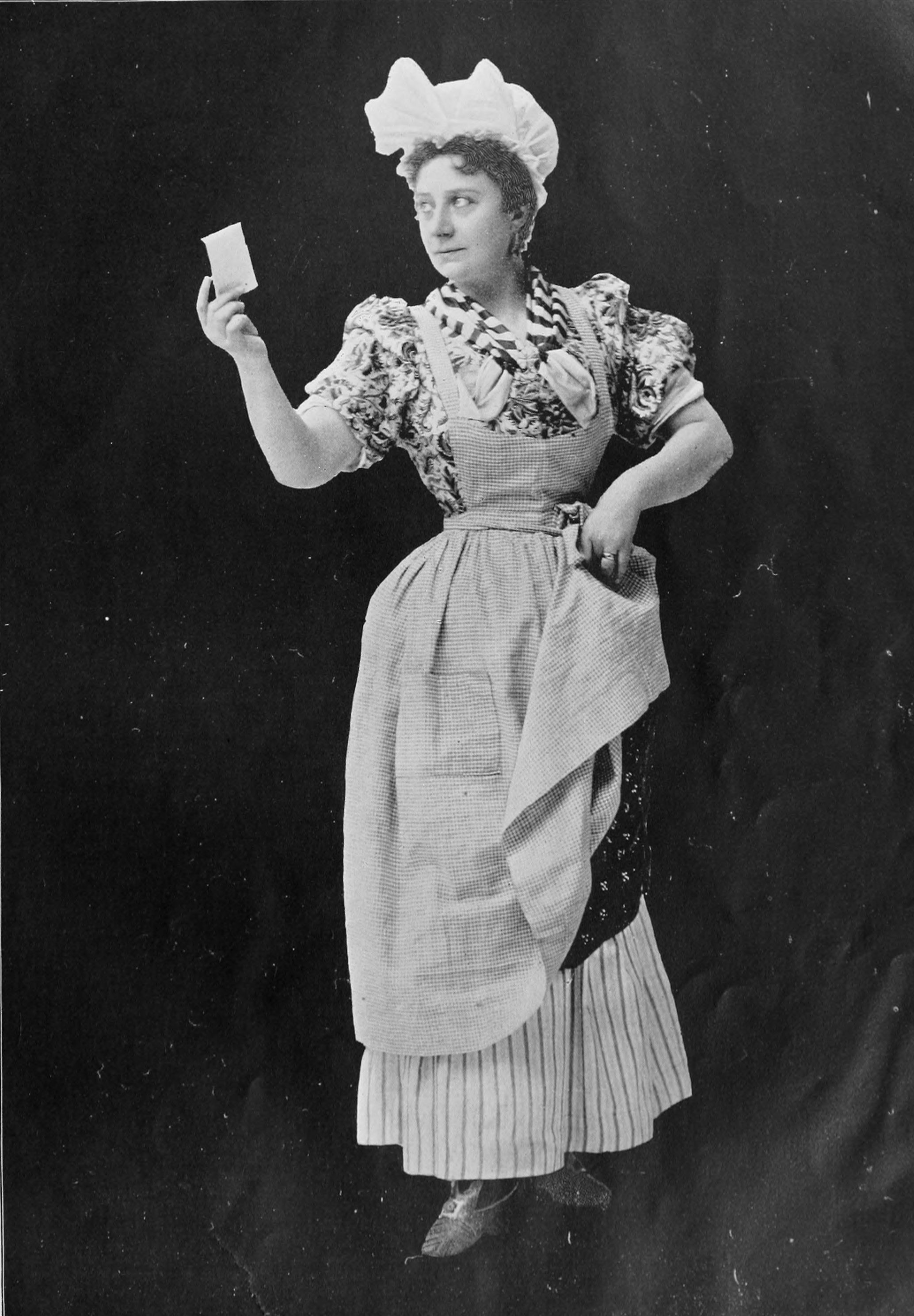
- Mathilde Cottrelly, 1896
- Born: Mathilde Meyer; February 7, 1851; Hamburg, Germany
- Died: June 15, 1933 (aged 82); Tuckerton, New Jersey
- Other names: Matilde Cottrelly; Mathilde Cotterly
- Occupations: Actress, Singer
- Years active: 1860s - 1926
- Spouses: George Cottrelly(1866-1869); Leopold A. Weste (m. 1881): Thomas J. Wilson(d. 1923)

Mathilde Cottrelly (February 7, 1851 in Hamburg, Germany – June 15, 1933 in Tuckerton, New Jersey) (née Meyer) was a German born stage actress, singer, producer and theatre manager. She was popular on Broadway in the 1880s until the 1920s. 1920s audiences saw her as the hypochondriac Mrs. Cohen in the long running play Abie's Irish Rose.

Cottrelly's father was an opera conductor in her native Hamburg, Germany. She was on the stage acting at an early age and by 16 she was married and singing roles in light opera presentations. Her husband died in 1871 and she continued to act and sing before coming to America in 1875. After starring in German theatres around the United States she joined McCaull's Comic Opera Company in New York. Though English was her second language Mathilde was never hampered by her German accent. In reviewing her first Broadway performance in English (Oct. 1882) The New York Times stated "Her mastery of the adopted tongue is complete," and a reviewer for the New York Sun (Dec. 1882) wrote "considering her nationality [Cottrelly] talks amazingly good English."

She became McCaull's leading comedian and wore many hats while with his company being a stage director, costume designer and, at times, handled the company's finances. McCaull made her a partner in the organization and musical comedy became her forte in the 1880s. In the 1890s and reaching her forties, Cottrelly settled into being a character actress which she remained for the rest of her career. Her talent and versatility kept her in demand (more than 30 productions between 1895 and 1926) and while many of her roles called for German or Yiddish accents she also won critical praise for portrayals of French, Spanish, and Swedish characters.

Mathilde Cottrelly was married four times, first to George Cottrelly (1866-71 his death), third to Leopold A. Weste (his fourth marriage, 1881–1885), and last to Thomas J. Wilson (1893-1923 his death). She and Cottrelly had one child, a son Alfred, who died in 1903. She died of a heart attack on June 15, 1933, at her home in Tuckerton, New Jersey.
