= New Jersey Historic Trust =

Government agency in New Jersey, United States

- Seal, State of New Jersey

Agency overview
- Formed: June 30, 1999
- Type: Historic preservation
- Jurisdiction: State of New Jersey
- Headquarters: Trenton, New Jersey
- Annual budget: $8.2 million
- Agency executives: Dorothy P. Guzzo, Executive Director; Peter Lindsay, Board Chair
- Parent department: Department of Community Affairs
- Key document: An act concerning the New Jersey Historic Trust
- Website: www.njht.org

The New Jersey Historic Trust was created by the State of New Jersey in 1967 to preserve New Jersey's historic resources. The Historic Trust's executive director is Dorothy P. Guzzo.

Funding programs available through the New Jersey Historic Trust are

- The Garden State Historic Preservation Trust Fund, which provides matching grants for planning and capital projects related to the repair, restoration and rehabilitation of historic properties.
- The Revolving Loan Fund offers low-interest, long-term financing for the repair, restoration and rehabilitation or purchase of historic properties.
- The Emergency Grant and Loan Fund offers grants and loans, usually small in size, for emergency work on endangered historic properties
- The Cultural Trust Capital Preservation Grant Program provides grants to historic and humanities-oriented organizations for the repair, restoration and rehabilitation of historic properties they own.

== See also ==
- New Jersey Historical Society
- New Jersey Register of Historic Places
- National Register of Historic Places listings in New Jersey
- List of the oldest buildings in New Jersey
- National Trust for Historic Preservation
