= Horner House =

Horner House may refer to:

in the United States (by state)

- Sidney H. Horner House, Helena, Arkansas, listed on the National Register of Historic Places (NRHP)
- Imre and Maria Horner House, Beverly Shores, Indiana, listed on the National Register of Historic Places in Porter County, Indiana
- Horner–Terrill House, Indianapolis, Indiana, USA; an NRHP listed house
- Horner House (Louisville, Kentucky), listed on the National Register of Historic Places in Jefferson County, Kentucky
- Horner House (Toms River, New Jersey), listed on the National Register of Historic Places in Ocean County, New Jersey
- Horner Houses, Burlington, North Carolina, listed on the National Register of Historic Places in Alamance County, North Carolina
- Horner House and Barn, Cumberland Township, Pennsylvania, NRHP-listed
- Horner-Hyde House, Pierre, South Dakota, NRHP-listed
- Druin-Horner House, near Richmond, Virginia, NRHP-listed
- John Scott Horner House, Ripon, Wisconsin, listed on the National Register of Historic Places in Fond du Lac County, Wisconsin

== See also ==
- Horner (disambiguation)
- House (disambiguation)
