= Horners =

Horners may refer to:

== Titles ==
- Horners, people from the Horn of Africa
- Cape Horners, demonym for seafarers or denizens of Cape Horn

== Places ==
- Horners, Virginia, unincorporated community
- Horners Green, hamlet in Groton, Suffolk

== Organizations ==
- Worshipful Company of Horners, guild association in London

== Science ==
- Horner's syndrome, facial disorder
- Hornerstown Formation, geological formation

== See also ==
- Horner sign (disambiguation)
- Horner (disambiguation)
