= Orner =

Orner is a surname. Notable people with the surname include:

- Eric Orner (born c. 1965), American cartoonist and animator
- Eva Orner, Australian film producer and director
- Peter Orner, American writer

== See also ==
- Horner
- Mörner
