= National Register of Historic Places listings in Ocean County, New Jersey =

Location of Ocean County in New Jersey

List of the National Register of Historic Places listings in Ocean County, New Jersey

Contents: Counties and communities in New Jersey
Atlantic – Bergen (Closter, Franklin Lakes, Ridgewood, Saddle River, Wyckoff) – Burlington – Camden – Cape May – Cumberland – Essex – Gloucester – Hudson – Hunterdon – Mercer – Middlesex – Monmouth – Morris – Ocean – Passaic – Salem – Somerset – Sussex – Union – Warren

This is intended to be a complete list of properties and districts listed on the National Register of Historic Places in Ocean County, New Jersey. Latitude and longitude coordinates of the sites listed on this page may be displayed in an online map.

This National Park Service list is complete through NPS recent listings posted October 16, 2026.

	Name on the Register	Image	Date listed	Location	City or town	Description
1	Barnegat Light Public School	Barnegat Light Public School	June 7, 1976 (#76001178)	501 Central Ave. 39°45′35″N 74°06′20″W	Barnegat Light	
2	Barnegat Lighthouse	Barnegat Lighthouse	January 25, 1971 (#71000512)	North end of Long Beach Island, off Broadway Ave. 39°45′51″N 74°06′23″W	Barnegat Light	
3	Bartlett-Rockhill-Bartlett House	Bartlett-Rockhill-Bartlett House	January 20, 2012 (#11001041)	Bartlett Ln. 39°36′04″N 74°20′35″W	Tuckerton	
4	Bay Head Historic District	Bay Head Historic District	February 1, 2006 (#05001566)	Roughly bounded by Point Pleasant Beach Borough line, Atlantic Ocean, Mantoloking Borough line and Point Pleasant; 40°04′18″N 74°02′51″W	Bay Head	
5	Beach Haven Historic District	Beach Haven Historic District	July 14, 1983 (#83001608)	Roughly bounded by Bay and Atlantic Avenues, Pearl and 3rd Streets; later roughly bounded by Atlantic, Bay, 5th and Chatsworth; 39°33′32″N 74°14′31″W	Beach Haven	Second set of addresses represents a boundary increase November 19, 2014. Also includes Converse Cottage and Dr. Edward H. Williams House
6	Captain Amos Birdsall House	Captain Amos Birdsall House	May 13, 1982 (#82003298)	234 Washington Street; 39°57′09″N 74°11′28″W	Toms River	Part of Old Village of Toms River MRA, destroyed by fire May 31, 2016
7	A. A. Brant House	A. A. Brant House	May 13, 1982 (#82003294)	9 Allen Street; 39°57′04″N 74°11′43″W	Toms River	Part of Old Village of Toms River MRA
8	Cassville Crossroads Historic District	Cassville Crossroads Historic District	August 26, 1982 (#82003291)	Junction of CR 571 and CR 528; 40°06′17″N 74°23′14″W	Jackson Township	
9	Cavalry Cottage	Cavalry Cottage	September 22, 2006 (#06000871)	100 Stafford Ave. 39°41′50″N 74°15′19″W	Stafford Township	
10	Cedar Bridge Tavern	Cedar Bridge Tavern	August 7, 2013 (#13000586)	200 Old Halfway Rd. 39°47′00″N 74°21′38″W	Barnegat Township	
11	Converse Cottage	Converse Cottage	July 14, 1983 (#83001609)	500 South Atlantic Avenue; 39°33′32″N 74°14′23″W	Beach Haven	Part of Beach Haven MRA
12	Mary Etta Cox House	Mary Etta Cox House	March 9, 2005 (#05000124)	353 North Main Street; 39°45′13″N 74°13′26″W	Barnegat Township	
13	Crawford House	Crawford House	May 13, 1982 (#82003295)	46 East Water Street; 39°57′03″N 74°11′46″W	Toms River	Part of Old Village of Toms River MRA
14	Double Trouble Historic District	Double Trouble Historic District	February 23, 1978 (#78001787)	S of Beachwood off Garden State Pkwy. 39°53′51″N 74°13′37″W	Bayville	
15	Falkinburg Farmstead	Falkinburg Farmstead	August 12, 1993 (#93000829)	28 Westcott Avenue, Waretown; 39°47′03″N 74°11′35″W	Ocean Township	
16	Elizabeth Sculthorp Force House	Elizabeth Sculthorp Force House	February 4, 2019 (#100003403)	26 Hadley Avenue; 39°57′10″N 74°11′28″W	Toms River	Also known as Pierson–Sculthorp House, Ocean County Historical Society
17	Georgian Court	Georgian Court	December 20, 1978 (#78001788)	Lakewood Avenue; 40°05′52″N 74°13′37″W	Lakewood	Also known as George Jay Gould Estate
18	Captain George W. Giberson House	Captain George W. Giberson House	August 12, 1982 (#82004693)	54 East Water Street; 39°57′03″N 74°11′46″W	Toms River	Part of Old Village of Toms River MRA
19	Hangar No. 1, Lakehurst Naval Air Station	Hangar No. 1, Lakehurst Naval Air Station	May 23, 1968 (#68000031)	N of Lakehurst on CR 547; 40°01′44″N 74°18′59″W	Manchester Township	
20	Horner House	Horner House	May 13, 1982 (#82003296)	44 East Water Street; 39°57′04″N 74°11′47″W	Toms River	Part of Old Village of Toms River MRA
21	L. Ron Hubbard Residence at Bay Head	L. Ron Hubbard Residence at Bay Head	May 17, 2018 (#100001777)	666 East Avenue; 40°03′50″N 74°02′40″W	Bay Head	L. Ron Hubbard House
22	Island Heights Historic District	Island Heights Historic District	July 8, 1982 (#82003290)	Roughly bounded by Toms River, Summit and River Avenues; 39°56′26″N 74°08′43″W	Island Heights	
23	Little Egg Harbor Friends Meeting House	Little Egg Harbor Friends Meeting House	December 9, 2002 (#02001511)	21 E. Main St. 39°36′12″N 74°20′29″W	Tuckerton	
24	Manahawkin Baptist Church	Manahawkin Baptist Church	April 3, 1973 (#73001131)	N. Main St. (US 9) and Lehigh Ave. 39°41′55″N 74°15′29″W	Manahawkin	
25	Manitou Park School House	Manitou Park School House	March 15, 2005 (#05000177)	167 Third Ave. 39°56′48″N 74°13′03″W	Berkeley Township	
26	Ocean County Courthouse	Ocean County Courthouse	August 16, 1983 (#83001610)	Washington Street; 39°57′10″N 74°11′41″W	Toms River	Part of Old Village of Toms River MRA
27	Ocean County Jail	Ocean County Jail	August 16, 1983 (#83001611)	Sheriff Street; 39°57′12″N 74°11′41″W	Toms River	Part of Old Village of Toms River MRA, demolished
28	Old Coast Guard Station Manasquan Inlet	Old Coast Guard Station Manasquan Inlet	May 14, 2021 (#100006508)	40 Inlet Drive; 40°06′10″N 74°02′15″W	Point Pleasant Beach	Also known as Coast Guard Lifeboat Station #105
29	Orient Baptist Church	Orient Baptist Church	August 10, 1977 (#77000902)	NJ 88, Laurelton; 40°04′11″N 74°07′40″W	Brick Township	Also known as the First Baptist Church of Laurelton
30	Seaside Heights Carousel	Seaside Heights Carousel	February 27, 2026 (#100012756)	1401 Ocean Terrace; 39°56′48″N 74°04′11″W	Seaside Heights	
31	Stewart House	Stewart House	May 13, 1982 (#82003297)	57 East Water Street; 39°57′03″N 74°11′46″W	Toms River	Part of Old Village of Toms River MRA
32	Stoutenburgh–Minturn House	Stoutenburgh–Minturn House	May 13, 1982 (#82003293)	86 East Water Street; 39°57′03″N 74°11′35″W	Toms River	Part of Old Village of Toms River MRA
33	Strand Theatre	Strand Theatre	April 22, 1982 (#82003292)	400 Clifton Ave. 40°05′39″N 74°12′57″W	Lakewood	
34	Torrey-Larrabee Store	Torrey-Larrabee Store	February 21, 1997 (#97000104)	11 Union Ave. 40°06′09″N 74°18′34″W	Lakehurst	
35	U.S. Life Saving Station No. 14	U.S. Life Saving Station No. 14	January 30, 1978 (#78001789)	S of Seaside Park on Island Beach State Park; 39°53′44″N 74°04′55″W	Berkeley Township	
36	Whitesbog Historic District	Whitesbog Historic District	October 27, 1988 (#88002115)	N of SR 70 and S of Fort Dix; 39°57′36″N 74°29′23″W	Whiting	Extends into Burlington County
37	Dr. Edward H. Williams House	Dr. Edward H. Williams House	July 14, 1983 (#83001612)	506 South Atlantic Avenue; 39°33′30″N 74°14′24″W	Beach Haven	Part of Beach Haven MRA
