= Mark Leiter =

American baseball player (born 1963)

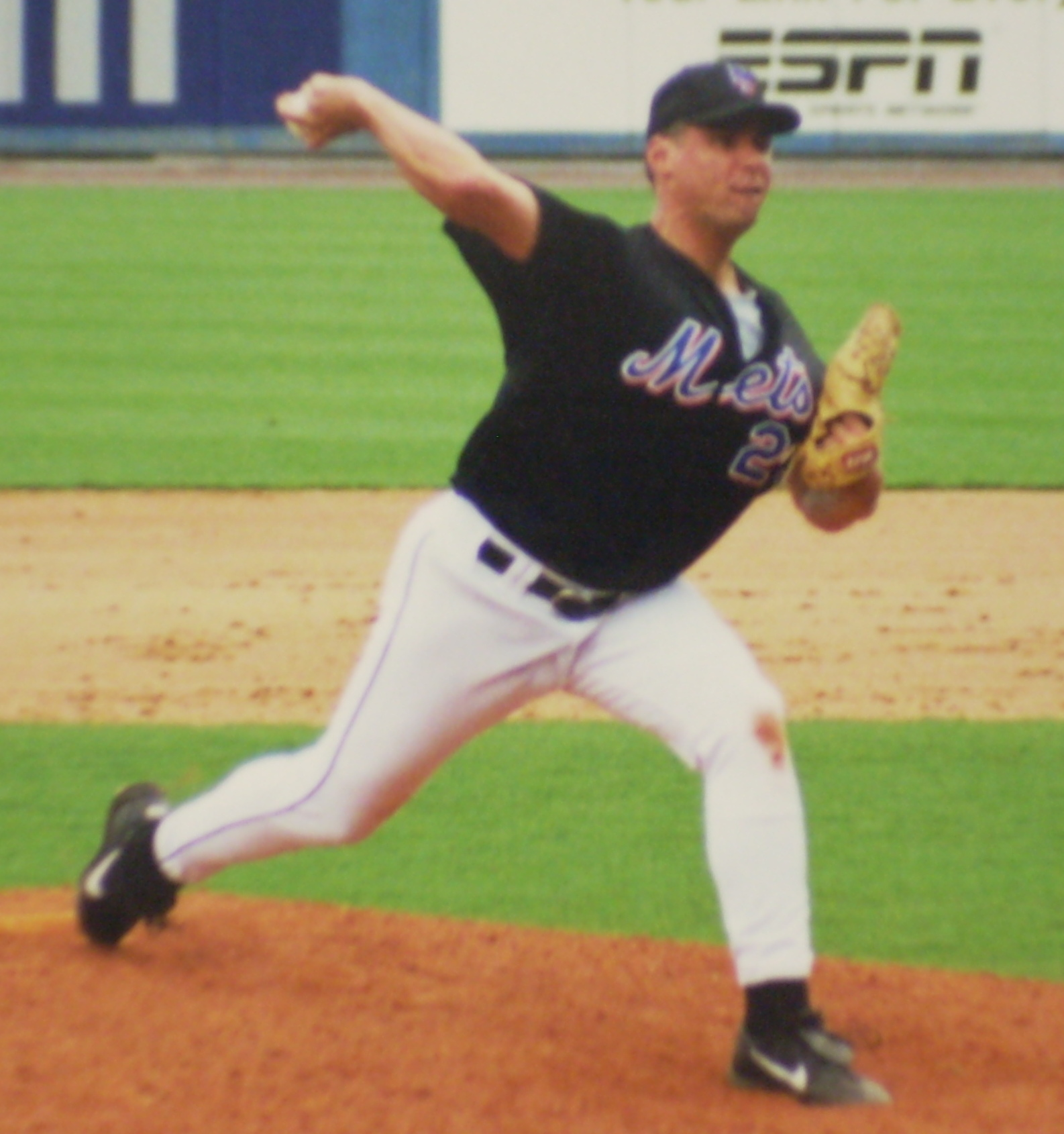
- Leiter with the New York Mets during spring training in 2001
- Pitcher
- Born: April 13, 1963 (age 62); Joliet, Illinois, U.S.
- Batted: Right Threw: Right

MLB debut
- July 24, 1990, for the New York Yankees

Last MLB appearance
- October 7, 2001, for the Milwaukee Brewers

MLB statistics
- Win–loss record: 65–73
- Earned run average: 4.57
- Strikeouts: 892
- Stats at Baseball Reference

Teams
- New York Yankees (1990); Detroit Tigers (1991–1993); California Angels (1994); San Francisco Giants (1995–1996); Montreal Expos (1996); Philadelphia Phillies (1997–1998); Seattle Mariners (1999); Milwaukee Brewers (2001)

Mark Edward Leiter (born April 13, 1963) is an American former professional baseball pitcher. He played in Major League Baseball (MLB) for the New York Yankees, Detroit Tigers, California Angels, San Francisco Giants, Montreal Expos, Philadelphia Phillies, Seattle Mariners, and Milwaukee Brewers from 1990 to 1999 and in 2001.

Drafted by the Baltimore Orioles in 1983, Leiter missed the 1986, 1987, and 1988 seasons due to a rotator cuff injury that required three surgeries. Released by the Orioles in 1988, he signed with the Yankees later that year and made his MLB debut in 1990. Leiter's younger brother Al, son Mark Jr., and nephew Jack have pitched in the major leagues.

== Early life and career ==
Leiter was born in Joliet, Illinois, on April 13, 1963, to Alex and Maria Leiter. His family moved to New Jersey shortly after he was born. He grew up in Berkeley Township, New Jersey, as one of seven children. He was a fan of the Philadelphia Phillies of Major League Baseball (MLB).

Leiter attended Central Regional High School in Bayville, New Jersey, where he played baseball as a pitcher together with his brother Al and Jeff Musselman. He graduated in 1981. Leiter attended Connors State College in Warner, Oklahoma, and Ramapo College in Mahwah, New Jersey. While pitching for Connors State in 1983, he threw a no-hitter.

== Professional career ==
The Baltimore Orioles selected Leiter in the fourth round of the January 1983 MLB draft. Leiter injured his shoulder in the 1985 season after the Orioles transitioned him from a starting pitcher to a relief pitcher, which he attributed to needing to pitch more frequently. He missed the 1986, 1987, and 1988 seasons with a rotator cuff injury in his right shoulder. He had two operations performed by Orioles doctors and worked as a corrections officer at the Ocean County Jail for four months in 1987. Not wanting to end his baseball career, Leiter decided to have a third surgery, which was performed by James Andrews in November 1987.

While Leiter rehabilitated from his third surgery, the Orioles released him in June 1988. He pitched in baseball camps and as a semi-professional before his brother Al, now with the New York Yankees, secured a tryout for Mark. The Yankees signed him to a minor league contract in September. He played in the minor leagues for the Fort Lauderdale Yankees and Columbus Clippers in 1989. He made his MLB debut with the Yankees on July 24, 1990. He remained with the Yankees for two weeks before he was optioned back to Columbus. They promoted him back to the major leagues on September 10 and he finished the 1990 season with a 6.84 earned run average (ERA) in 26 1/3 innings pitched in eight games for the Yankees.

On March 19, 1991, the Yankees traded Leiter to the Detroit Tigers for Torey Lovullo. He made the Tigers' Opening Day roster. He had a 4.21 ERA in 134 2/3 innings pitched for the Tigers in 1991 and a 4.18 ERA in 112 innings pitched in 1992. Leiter missed the second half of the 1993 season with a recurrence of his shoulder injury. He finished the season with a 6–6 win–loss record and a 4.73 ERA. He underwent a fourth arthroscopic surgery during the offseason.

On March 15, 1994, the Tigers released Leiter during spring training as they wanted to prioritize their younger pitchers. Days later, he signed as a free agent with the California Angels. He had a 4.72 ERA in 95 1/3 innings for the Angels. After the season, he won the Tony Conigliaro Award for overcoming the adversity of his son's death.

Leiter signed as a free agent with the San Francisco Giants before the 1995 season. In is first major league season as a full-time starting pitcher, Leiter had a 10–12 win–loss record and a 3.82 ERA. His seven complete games were the second-most in the National League. He and Mark Carreon were the co-winners of the Willie Mac Award, honoring his spirit and leadership, in 1995. Leiter was the Opening Day starting pitcher for the Giants in 1996. Leiter had a 4–10 record with a 5.19 ERA in 23 games.

On July 30, 1996, the Giants traded Leiter to the Montreal Expos for Kirk Rueter and Tim Scott. He had a 4–2 record and a 4.39 ERA with Montreal. After the season, he became a free agent and signed a two-year contract with the Philadelphia Phillies for $4.3 million, plus incentives. Leiter had a 10–17 record with a 5.67 ERA in 1997. The Phillies used Leiter as a relief pitcher in 1998, and he recorded 23 saves with a 3.55 ERA. At the end of the 1998 season, the Phillies exercised his option and traded him to the Seattle Mariners for Paul Spoljaric. Leiter missed the beginning of the regular season with shoulder troubles and went back on the disabled list in May. He missed the remainder of the season.

On February 9, 2000, Leiter signed as a free agent with the Pittsburgh Pirates. He refused an assignment to the minor leagues and the Pirates released him. Al, now pitching for the New York Mets, encouraged the team to sign Mark and they offered him a non-roster invitation to spring training, which he accepted. On March 26, the Mets traded Leiter to the Colorado Rockies for Brian Rose. Then on April 4, the Rockies traded Leiter, Mike DeJean, and Elvis Peña to the Milwaukee Brewers for Juan Acevedo, Kane Davis, and Jose Flores. He had a 3.75 ERA in 36 innings pitched for the Brewers. Leiter signed with the Newark Bears of the Atlantic League, an independent baseball league, for the 2002 season. He pitched to a 3.78 ERA in 95 1/3 innings pitched for the Bears.

== Personal life ==
Mark's older brother, Kurt, spent four seasons as a pitcher in the Orioles' minor-league organization (1982–1984, 1986). His younger brother, Al Leiter, was a major league pitcher from 1987 to 2005. His son, Mark Leiter Jr., has also pitched in MLB. His nephew, Jack Leiter, pitches in MLB for the Texas Rangers.

In addition to Mark Jr, Mark and his wife, Allison, had a daughter, Kaley, and a son, Ryan. In 1994, Ryan died of spinal muscular atrophy when he was nine months old. Mark and Allison started the Ryan Leiter Fund to raise funds for families of victims of the disease.

Leiter owns a pitching and hitting clinic in Toms River, New Jersey.
