= Battle of Cedar Bridge =

American Revolutionary War battle in New Jersey

Coordinates: 39.7832°N 74.3607°W

- Part of American Revolutionary War
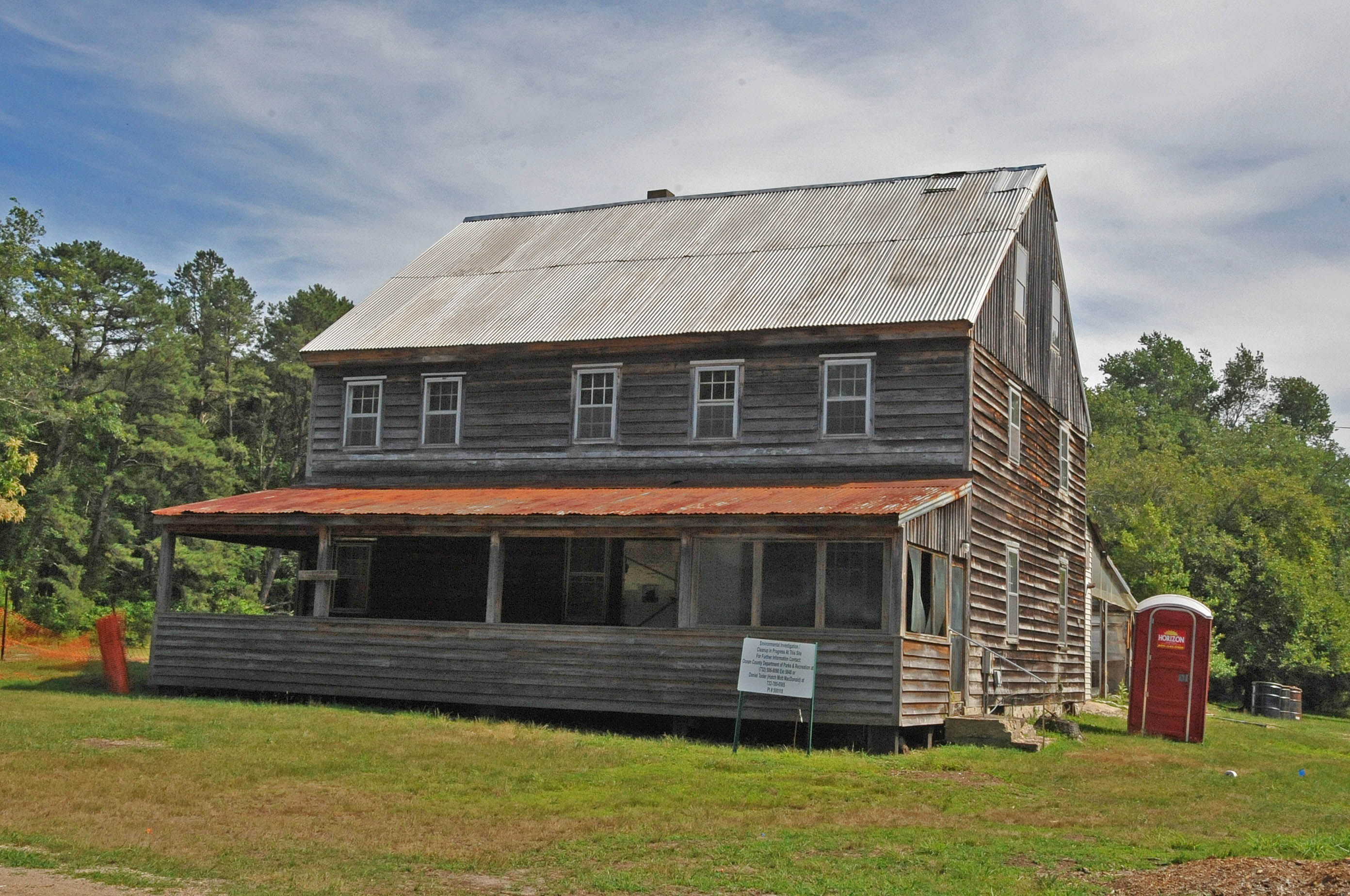
- The Cedar Bridge Tavern near where Captain John Bacon and his Loyalist "Refugees" (military associators) skirmished with local Patriot militia in the last documented conflict of the American Revolutionary War.
Date	December 27, 1782
Location	Barnegat Township, New Jersey
Result	Patriot victory

Belligerents
(Kingdom of Great Britain) Loyalist militia: Pine Robbers	(United States) Patriot militia

Commanders and leaders
John Bacon (WIA)	Richard Shreve; Edward Thomas

Strength
Unknown	28 militia

Casualties and losses
1 killed 4 wounded Several captured	1 killed 4 wounded

The Battle of Cedar Bridge, fought in Barnegat Township, New Jersey, was one of the last skirmishes of the American Revolutionary War, between Continental militia under Captains Richard Shreve and Edward Thomas and Loyalist militia under John Bacon on December 27, 1782.

Bacon had killed 30 sleeping American seamen on the colonists' ship, the Alligator, and perpetrated other acts of terror on suspected Continental supporters. A reward of 50 pounds for Bacon's capture was offered by the governor of New Jersey, William Livingston.

A Continental militia, commanded by Richard Shreve and Edward Thomas, set out to hunt Bacon down on December 1782. After several days of unsuccessful search it returned to Burlington, New Jersey. En route, the Continentals stopped at the tavern near the bridge, unaware of Bacon and his men on the other side.

Learning that the Continental militia was nearby, Bacon had little time to escape and so decided to barricade the bridge and open fire on the Continentals. After holding off the Continentals for some time the Continentals began to overcome them. Local inhabitants heard the gunfire and came to the aid of the Loyalists, which gave Bacon and his men time to escape. The Continentals overpowered the local Loyalist supporters and captured several of them.

Bacon was discovered, captured, and killed at a tavern in Tuckerton, New Jersey, a few months after the engagement. He was so hated among the populace there that his corpse was paraded through town and around the countryside before its burial in an unmarked grave.
