= Hornery =

Hornery is a surname. Notable people with the surname include:

- Alan Hornery (fl. 1948–1957), Australian rugby league footballer
- Andrew Hornery (fl. 2022), Sydney Morning Herald columnist
- Bob Hornery (1931–2015), Australian actor
- Sonia Hornery (born 1961), Australian politician

== See also ==
- Horner
- The Hornery Stiffmen, Connan Mockasin band
