= Orient Baptist Church =

Historic church in New Jersey, United States

- U.S. National Register of Historic Places
- New Jersey Register of Historic Places
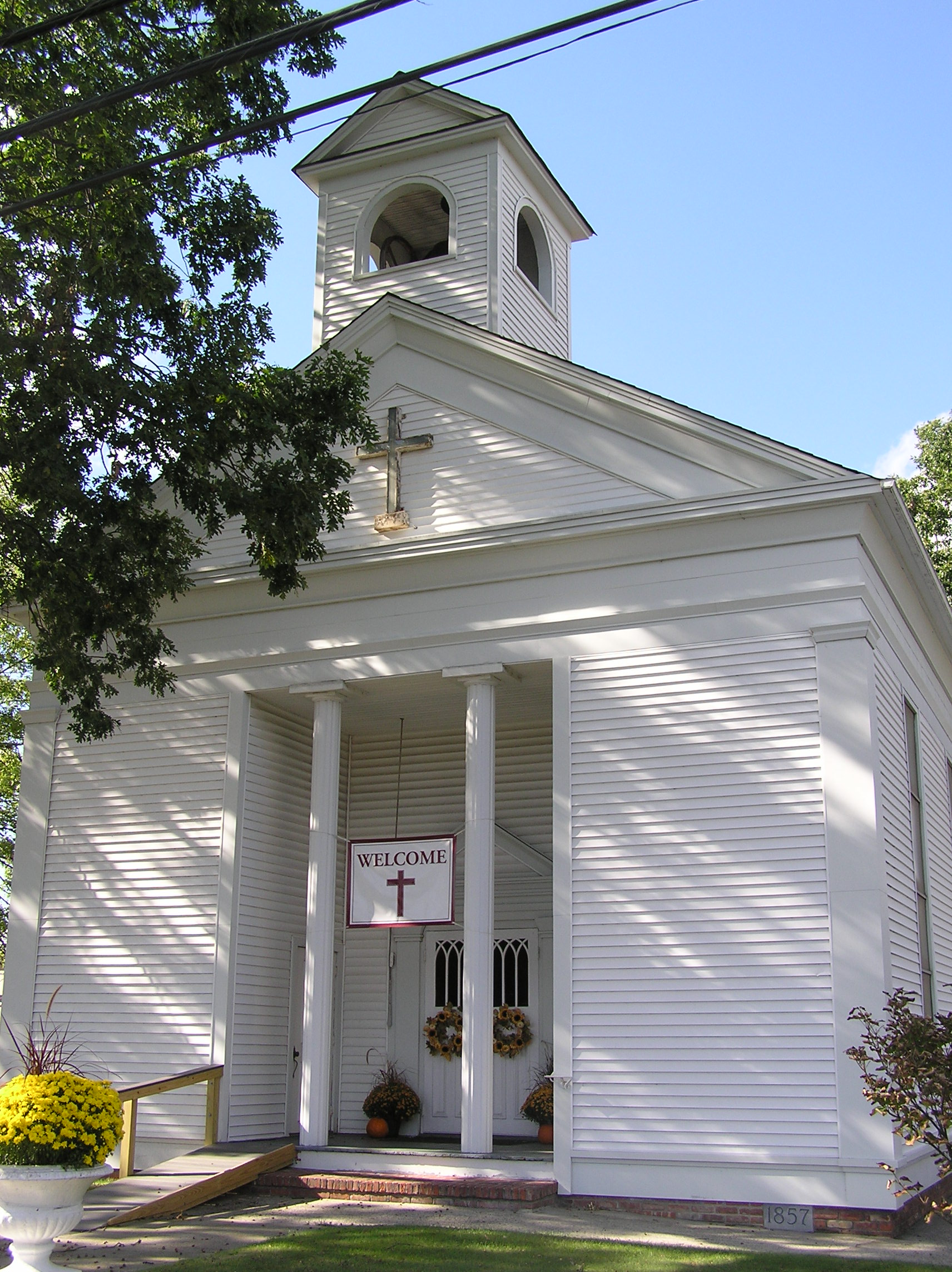

- Location within Ocean County, New Jersey Location within New Jersey Location within the United States
- Location: 1836 NJ Route 88, Laurelton, New Jersey
- Coordinates: 40°4′11″N 74°7′40″W
- Built: 1857
- Built by: James L. Dorsett
- Architectural style: Greek Revival
- NRHP reference No.: 77000902
- NJRHP No.: 2279

Significant dates
- Added to NRHP: August 10, 1977
- Designated NJRHP: January 10, 1977

The Orient Baptist Church, also known as the First Baptist Church of Laurelton, is located at 1836 NJ Route 88 in the Laurelton section of Brick Township in Ocean County, New Jersey, United States. The historic Greek Revival building was constructed in 1857 by James L. Dorsett on land bequeathed by Reverend Abraham O. S. Havens. The congregation was organized in 1858. The church building was added to the National Register of Historic Places on August 10, 1977, for its significance in architecture and religion.

== See also ==
- National Register of Historic Places listings in Ocean County, New Jersey
