= Crawford House (Toms River, New Jersey) =

- U.S. National Register of Historic Places
- New Jersey Register of Historic Places
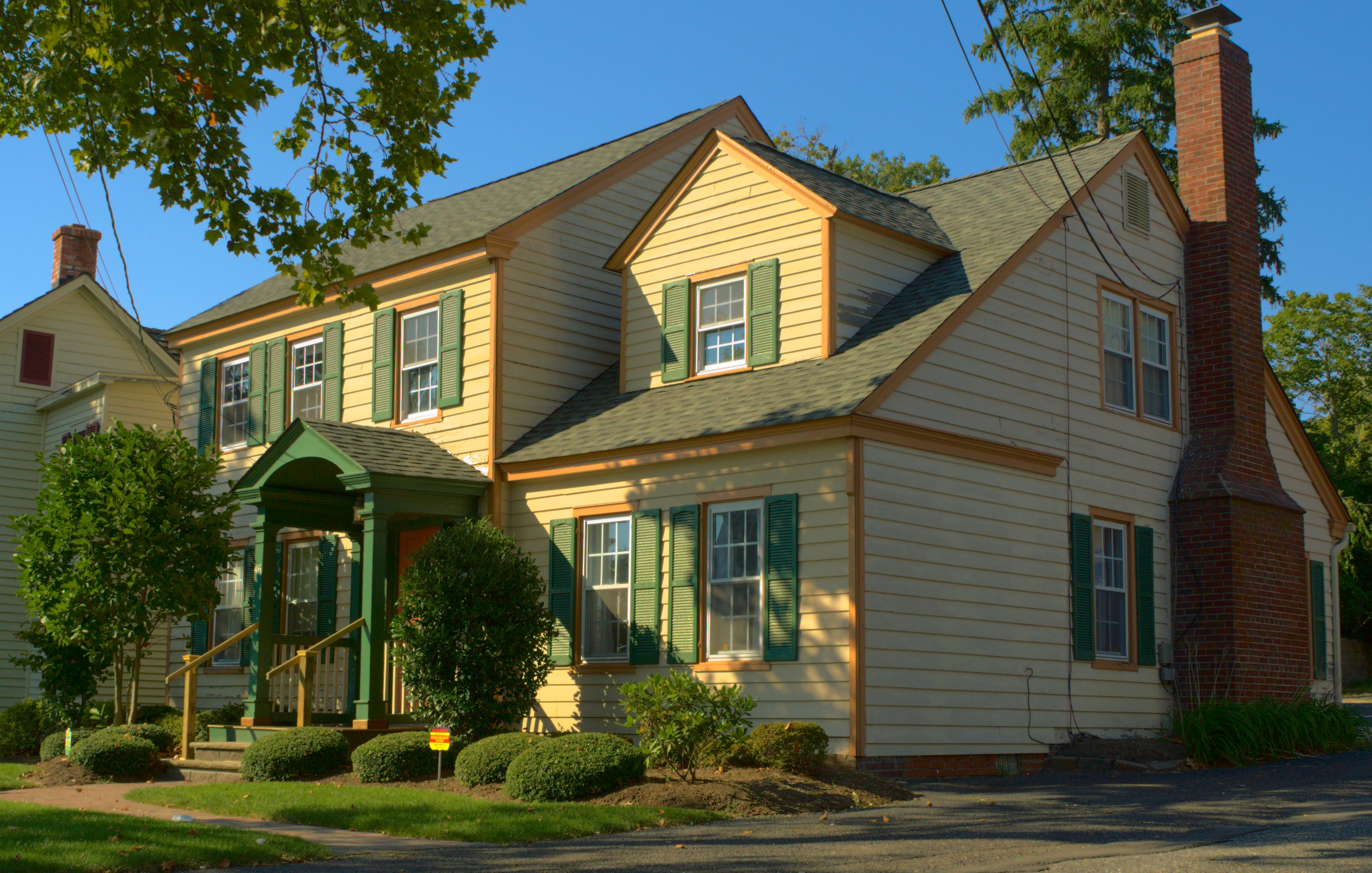

- Location within Ocean County, New Jersey Location within New Jersey Location within the United States
- Location: 46 East Water Street, Toms River, New Jersey
- Coordinates: 39°57′03″N 74°11′46″W
- Built: c. 1827
- Architectural style: Vernacular Georgian Federal
- MPS: Old Village of Toms River MRA
- NRHP reference No.: 82003295
- NJRHP No.: 2288

Significant dates
- Added to NRHP: May 13, 1982
- Designated NJRHP: June 17, 1981

The Crawford House is located at 46 East Water Street in Toms River in Ocean County, New Jersey, United States. The historic Georgian/Federal style house was built around 1827. It was added to the National Register of Historic Places on May 13, 1982, for its significance in architecture and commerce. It was listed as part of the Old Village of Toms River Multiple Property Submission (MPS).

== See also ==
- National Register of Historic Places listings in Ocean County, New Jersey
