= A. A. Brant House =

Historic house in New Jersey, United States

- U.S. National Register of Historic Places
- New Jersey Register of Historic Places
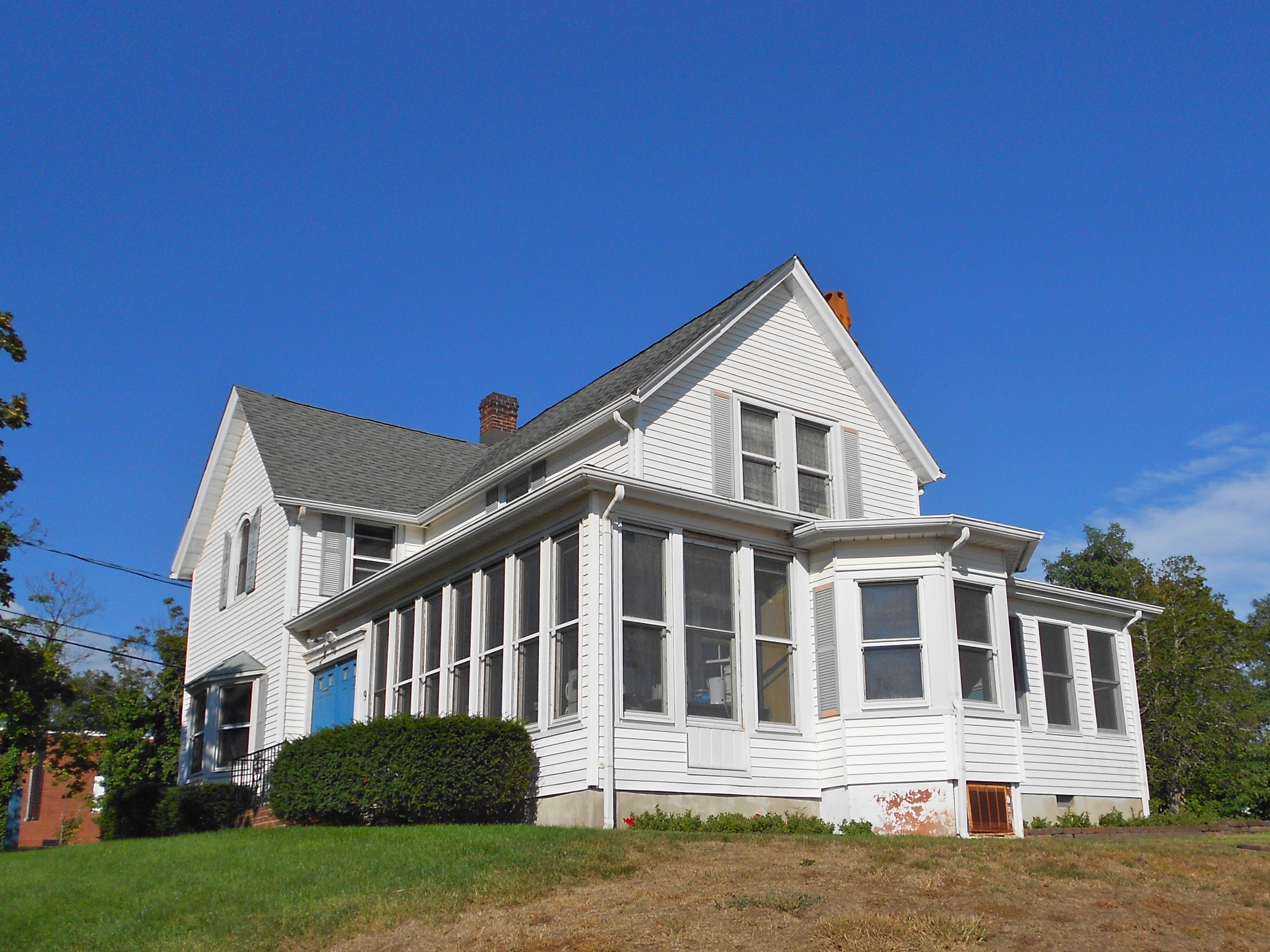

- Location within Ocean County, New Jersey Location within New Jersey Location within the United States
- Location: 9 Allen Street, Toms River, New Jersey
- Coordinates: 39°57′04″N 74°11′43″W
- Built: 1867
- Built by: Joseph A. Pharo
- Architectural style: Vernacular Queen Ann
- MPS: Old Village of Toms River MRA
- NRHP reference No.: 82003294
- NJRHP No.: 2286

Significant dates
- Added to NRHP: May 13, 1982
- Designated NJRHP: June 17, 1981

The A. A. Brant House is located at 9 Allen Street in Toms River in Ocean County, New Jersey, United States. The historic Queen Ann house was built in 1867. It was added to the National Register of Historic Places on May 13, 1982, for its significance in architecture and engineering. It was listed as part of the Old Village of Toms River Multiple Property Submission (MPS).

== See also ==
- National Register of Historic Places listings in Ocean County, New Jersey
