= John Bacon (loyalist) =

Tory guerrilla during the American Revolution

- Died: April 3, 1783; Long Beach Island, Ocean County, New Jersey
- Resting place: Arneytown, Ocean County, New Jersey
- Other name: Bloody John
- Occupations: Shingler, soldier, outlaw, criminal gang leader
- Military career
- Allegiance: Kingdom of Great Britain
- Branch: Governor Franklin's Associated Loyalists
- Service years: 1780-1782
- Rank: Captain
- Conflicts: American Revolutionary War: Manahawkin Skirmish (1781); Long Beach Island Massacre (1782); Battle of Cedar Bridge (1782)

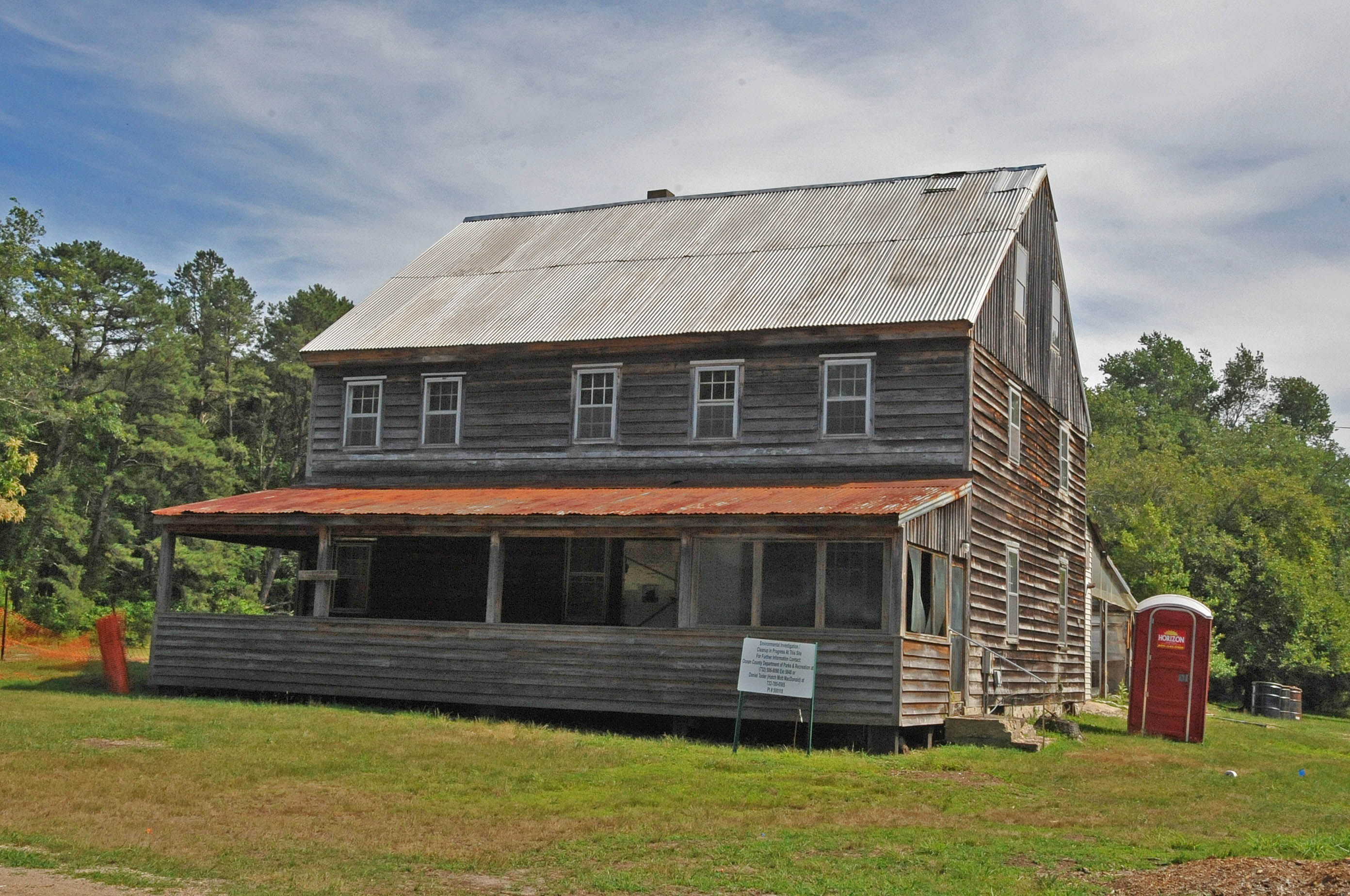
The Cedar Bridge Tavern near where Captain John Bacon and his Loyalist "Refugees" (military associators) skirmished with local Patriot militia in the last documented conflict of the American Revolutionary War; December 1782

John Bacon (died April 3, 1783) (also "Bloody John Bacon"), was a leader of the Pine Robbers, a band of Loyalist guerrilla fighters who hid out in the Pine Barrens of south-central New Jersey and preyed upon Patriots toward the end of the American Revolutionary War. The group was responsible for the October 1782 Long Beach Island Massacre, which occurred after hostilities between the United States and Great Britain had been put on hold pending treaty negotiations. He and his band were relentlessly pursued thereafter. Bacon was killed the following March while resisting capture (considered by several historians to be the last casualty of the war).

== Early life ==
John Bacon's origins are not known. He first appeared in public documents in 1775 as a shingler in Monmouth County, Province of New Jersey required to appear in local court for unpaid debts. Bacon was married and had two sons who resided with him in Pemberton, New Jersey.

== The Pine Robbers ==
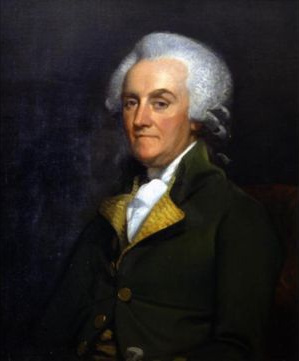
William Franklin, the royal governor of the New Jersey colony, helped organize associator military units—including Bacon's Refugees

Bacon purportedly served at one point in the Patriot militia, but subsequently joined with the Loyalist side. He became a member of the "Board of Associated Loyalists" an organization of associators, which was chartered by King George III and overseen by William Franklin, British royal governor of the New Jersey Colony (and son of Benjamin Franklin). Franklin chose Bacon as the military leader of the "Pine Robbers" (which later became known as "The Refugees"), a guerrilla-style fighting unit which financed its operations through war-time plunder. The organization's purpose was to conduct raids and to seize supplies from the Patriots. Bacon readily fulfilled the organization's mission by raiding ground transports, depots, ships, and Patriot homes (including those belonging to members of the Monmouth Militia).

Bacon and his band of marauders were involved in the October 1782 Long Beach Island Massacre, and the following December were in a skirmish at the Cedar Bridge Tavern in New Jersey. Bacon's subsequent death several months after this engagement is often characterized as the last casualty of the American Revolutionary War.

=== A skirmish at Manahawkin ===
Manahawkin, New Jersey militiamen had heard rumors that Bacon and his men, now known as "The Refugees," were planning to raid the town. The local militia met on December 30, 1781, at Captain Reuben Randolph's home to plan the town's defense. On the morning of December 31, Bacon and his men, totaling between 30 and 40, arrived from the direction of Barnegat Township. Before the militiamen were fully organized, Bacon and his men opened fire, killing Lines Pangbon and wounding Sylvester Tilton.

=== Long Beach Island Massacre ===
On October 25, 1782, Bacon conspired with a Loyalist sympathizer who was working on the offloading of cargo from a cutter which had become stranded at Barnegat Shoals, to hijack the operation. He and his band stealthily murdered 19 men in their sleep, including Militia Captain Andrew Steelman. The attack, occurring after formal hostilities between the United States and Great Britain had paused because of peace negotiations, was considered so atrocious that Governor William Livingston put a bounty of fifty pounds on Bacon's head.

=== Affair at Cedar Bridge ===
A gun battle involving Bacon and his men near the Cedar Bridge Tavern, on the Jersey Shore, was the last documented conflict of the American Revolutionary War. In December 1782, Captain Richard Shreve, heading a Patriot force from Burlington, received word that Bacon and his troop were in the area. They came upon Bacon and his men as they were camped out near a tavern overlooking the Cedar Bridge crossing. The Refugees fired upon Shreve and his men as they approached Cedar Bridge, wounding him and three others. Bacon was wounded along with four of his fighters, but he escaped. Several of his men, however, were captured. The battle came to be known as "The Affair at Cedar Bridge

== Final confrontation and death ==
On March 31, 1783, Bacon was finally tracked down by armed forces of the new republic on Long Beach Island where he was spotted scavenging a shipwreck. A search party of six men, led by Captain John Stewart, was sent out to find Bacon, who was found at the Rose Tavern. Stewart wrestled him to the ground before Bacon could grab his musket. Stewart stabbed Bacon with his bayonet and quickly shot him, causing his death.

Bacon's body was ceremoniously brought to Jacobstown, where the citizens were preparing a disrespectful burial in the middle of the road, when Bacon's brother arrived begging for a proper burial. His body was taken by his family to a cemetery in Arneytown.

== Legacy ==
There is an annual re-enactment of the Affair at Cedar Bridge each December 27 at the Cedar Bridge Tavern.
