= Stoutenburgh–Minturn House =

- U.S. National Register of Historic Places
- New Jersey Register of Historic Places
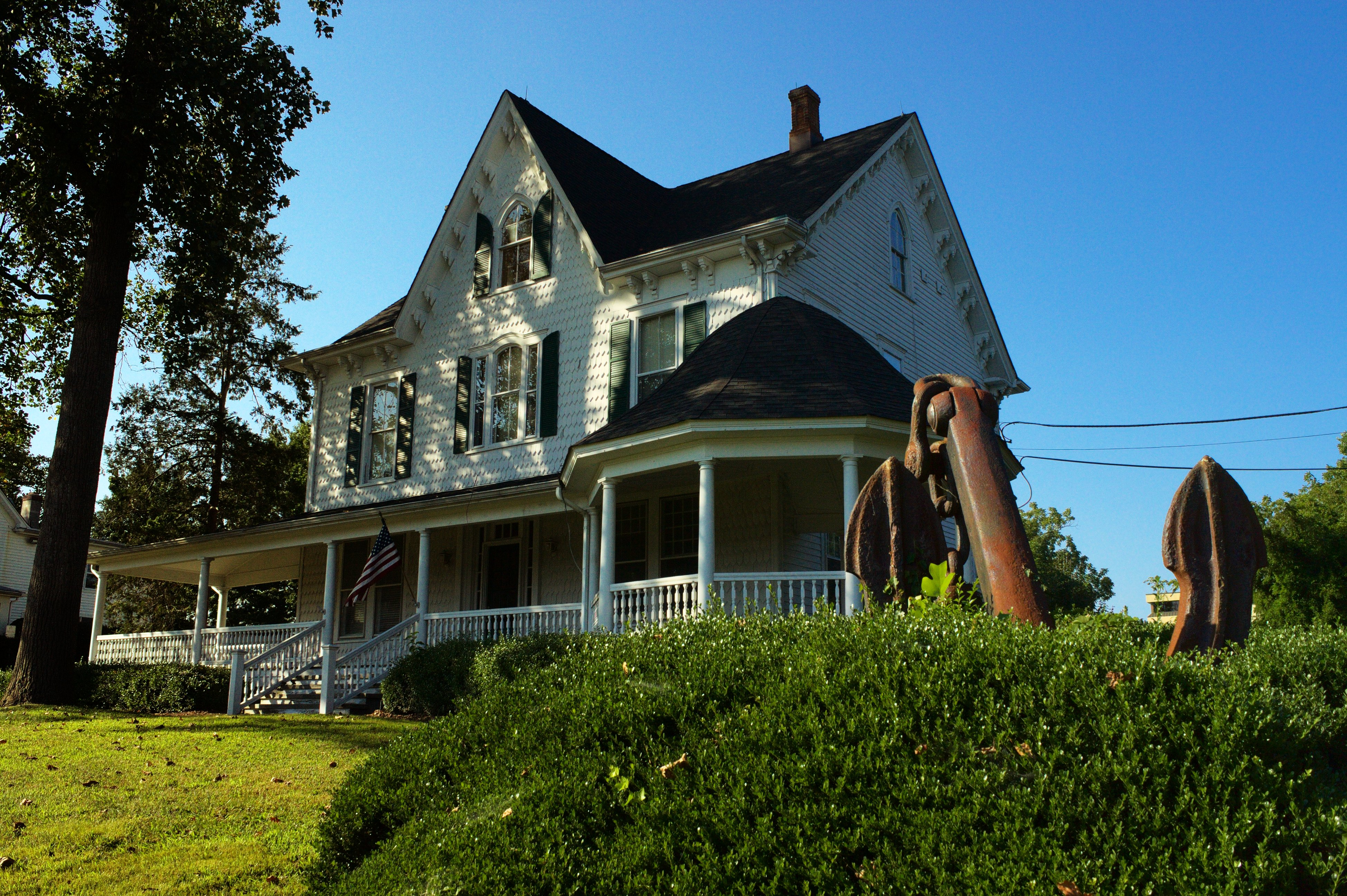

- Location within Ocean County, New Jersey Location within New Jersey Location within the United States
- Location: 86 East Water Street, Toms River, New Jersey
- Coordinates: 39°57′03″N 74°11′35″W
- Built: 1868
- Architectural style: Vernacular Gothic Cottage
- MPS: Old Village of Toms River MRA
- NRHP reference No.: 82003293
- NJRHP No.: 2295

Significant dates
- Added to NRHP: May 13, 1982
- Designated NJRHP: June 17, 1981

The Stoutenburgh–Minturn House is located at 86 East Water Street in Toms River in Ocean County, New Jersey, United States. The Victorian Gothic house was built in 1868 for Rebecca Finn. It was added to the National Register of Historic Places on May 13, 1982, for its significance in architecture. It was listed as part of the Old Village of Toms River Multiple Property Submission (MPS). It is currently used as an event rental space for weddings and photography.

== See also ==
- National Register of Historic Places listings in Ocean County, New Jersey
