= Pine Robbers =

British Loyalists during the American Revolutionary War

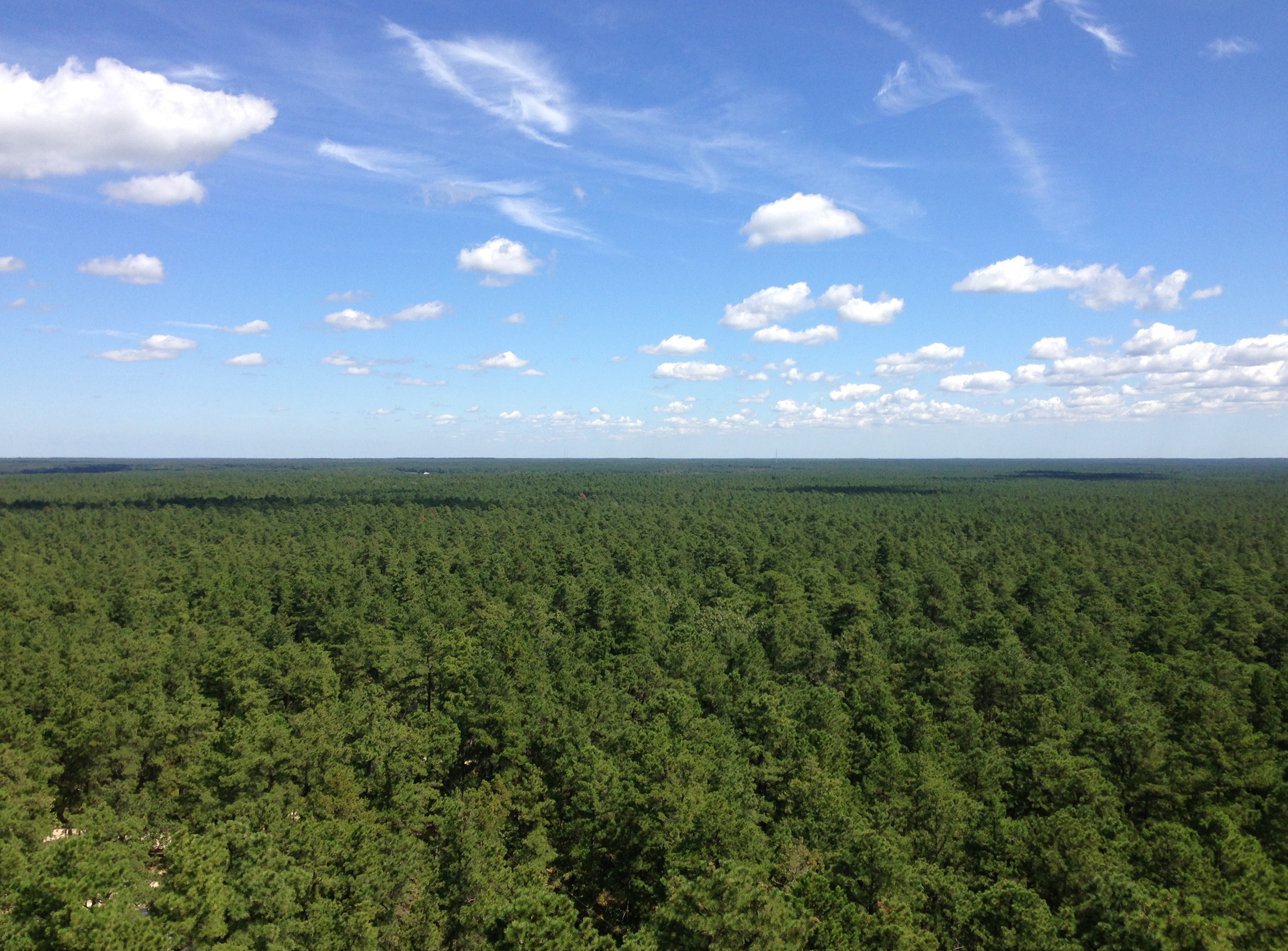
- The Pine Barrens of New Jersey, home to the outlaw "Pine Robbers"
- Years active: 1776-1783
- Territory: New Jersey Pine Barrens
- Ethnicity: British-American
- Criminal activities: horse theft, highway robbery, cattle raiding, burglary, murder

The "Pine Robbers" were loosely organized Loyalist outlaw gangs who used the New Jersey Pine Barrens during the American Revolutionary War to wreak havoc in the area. The pine barrens created densely forested terrain where concealment of guerrilla and criminal activities could easily be carried out.

== Guerrilla and criminal activities ==
While the Loyalists, who had received their land from the Crown, were amiable neighbors during the day and enemies of the Patriots by night, the pine robbers were disgruntled sailors who had jumped ship. They banded with local outlaws to burn and plunder throughout the New Jersey Pine Barrens. The pine robbers were commonly known to commit crimes against Patriots and, sometimes, Loyalists.

== Fagan Gang ==
One of the most infamous pine robber gangs was the Fagan Gang led by Loyalist leader Jacob Fagan and his associate Lewis Fenton.

== John Bacon and the "Refugees" ==
John Bacon was one of the more notorious Loyalist leaders of the pine robbers. In December 1782, Bacon and his gang, the "Refugees," were involved in the Battle of Cedar Bridge. A surprise attack by Captain Edward Thomas of the Mansfield Militia and Captain Richard Shreeve of the Burlington County Light Horse forced Bacon to quickly build a makeshift barricade at Cedar Bridge. The Patriot forces charged the Refugees, but Bacon and three gang members escaped.

On April 3, 1783, John Bacon was surrounded by the Patriot militia from Burlington, New Jersey, while drinking in a local tavern. With no chance of escape, he was bayoneted and shot to death.

== See also ==
- De Lancey's Brigade
- Doan Gang
- Harpe brothers
- New Jersey Volunteers
