= Stewart House (Toms River, New Jersey) =

- U.S. National Register of Historic Places
- New Jersey Register of Historic Places
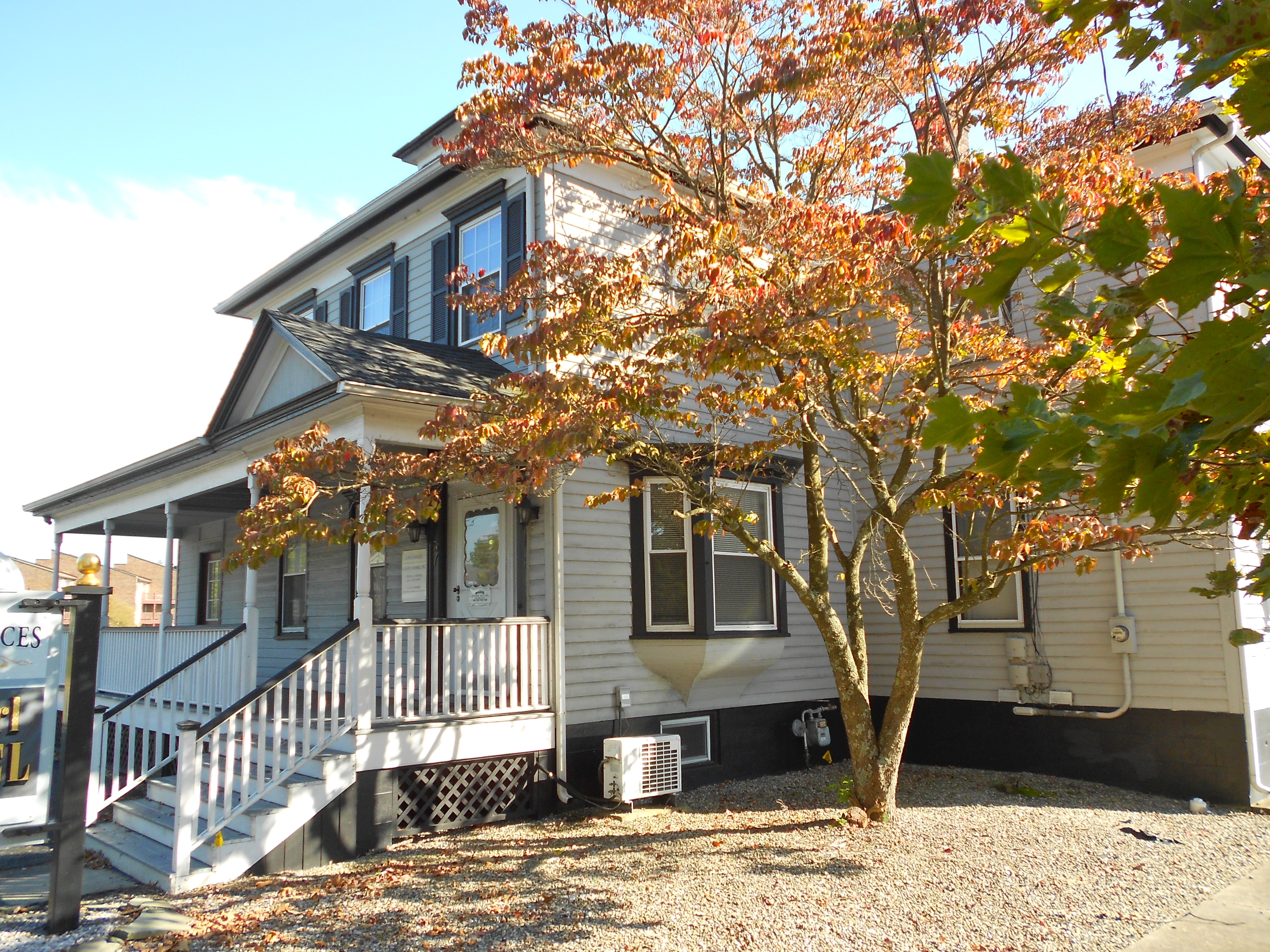
- Photo from 2013

- Location within Ocean County, New Jersey Location within New Jersey Location within the United States
- Location: 57 East Water Street, Toms River, New Jersey
- Coordinates: 39°57′03″N 74°11′46.3″W
- Built: c. 1849
- Architectural style: Vernacular Italianate
- MPS: Old Village of Toms River MRA
- NRHP reference No.: 82003297
- NJRHP No.: 2294

Significant dates
- Added to NRHP: May 13, 1982
- Designated NJRHP: June 17, 1981

The Stewart House, also known as the Dover House, is located at 57 East Water Street in Toms River in Ocean County, New Jersey, United States. Built around 1849, the historic Italianate house was added to the National Register of Historic Places on May 13, 1982, for its significance in transportation. It was listed as part of the Old Village of Toms River Multiple Property Submission (MPS).

== See also ==
- National Register of Historic Places listings in Ocean County, New Jersey
