= Elizabeth Sculthorp Force House =

- U.S. National Register of Historic Places
- New Jersey Register of Historic Places
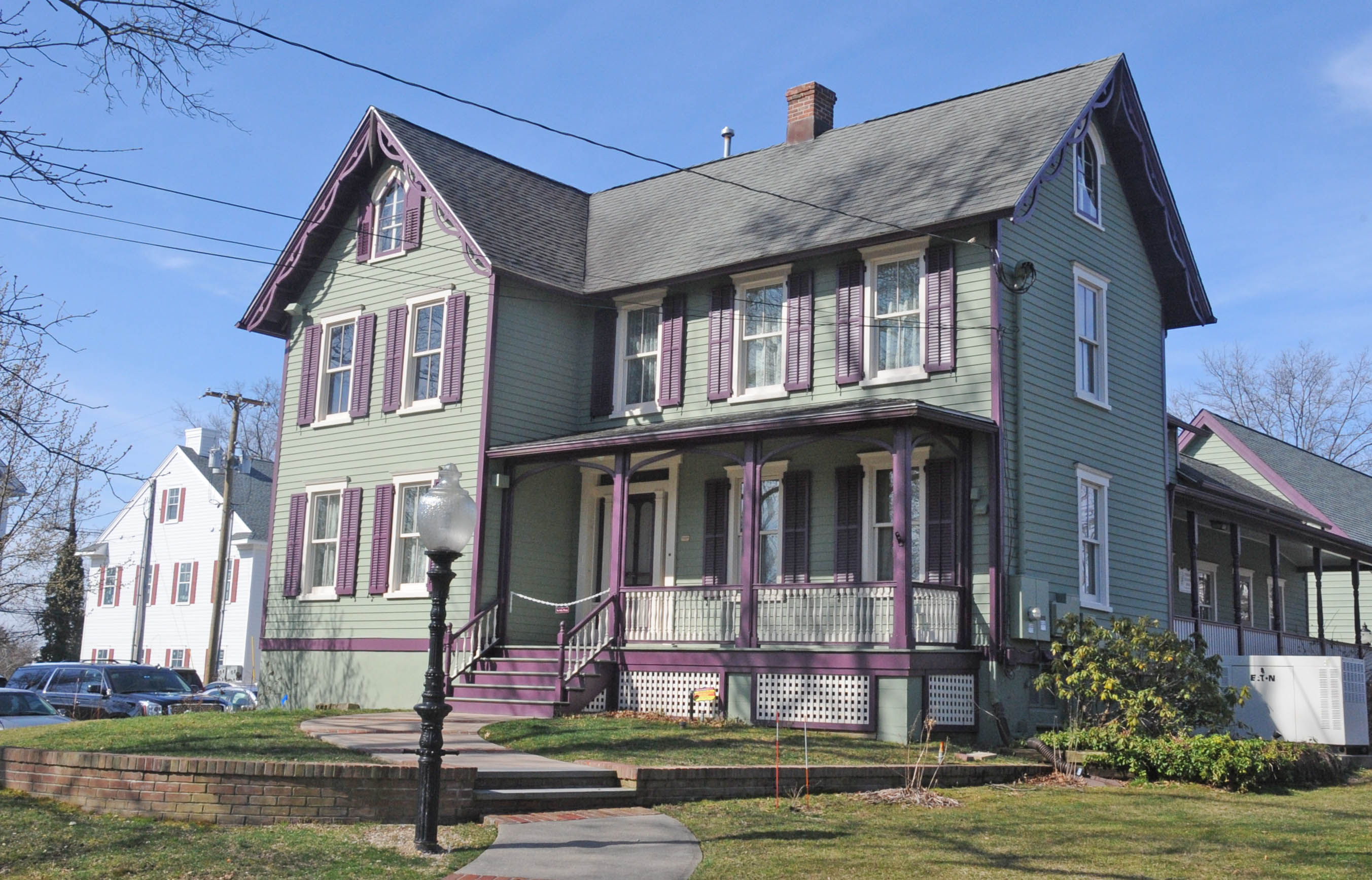

- Location within Ocean County, New Jersey Location within New Jersey Location within the United States
- Location: 26 Hadley Avenue, Toms River, New Jersey
- Coordinates: 39°57′10.4″N 74°11′28″W
- NRHP reference No.: 100003403
- NJRHP No.: 5623

Significant dates
- Added to NRHP: February 4, 2019
- Designated NJRHP: December 12, 2018

The Elizabeth Sculthorp Force House, also known as the Pierson–Sculthorp House, is located at 26 Hadley Avenue in Toms River in Ocean County, New Jersey, United States. The historic house was added to the National Register of Historic Places on February 4, 2019, for its significance in education. It is currently the home of the Ocean County Historical Society.

== See also ==
- National Register of Historic Places listings in Ocean County, New Jersey
- List of museums in New Jersey
