= Old Coast Guard Station Manasquan Inlet =

- U.S. National Register of Historic Places
- New Jersey Register of Historic Places
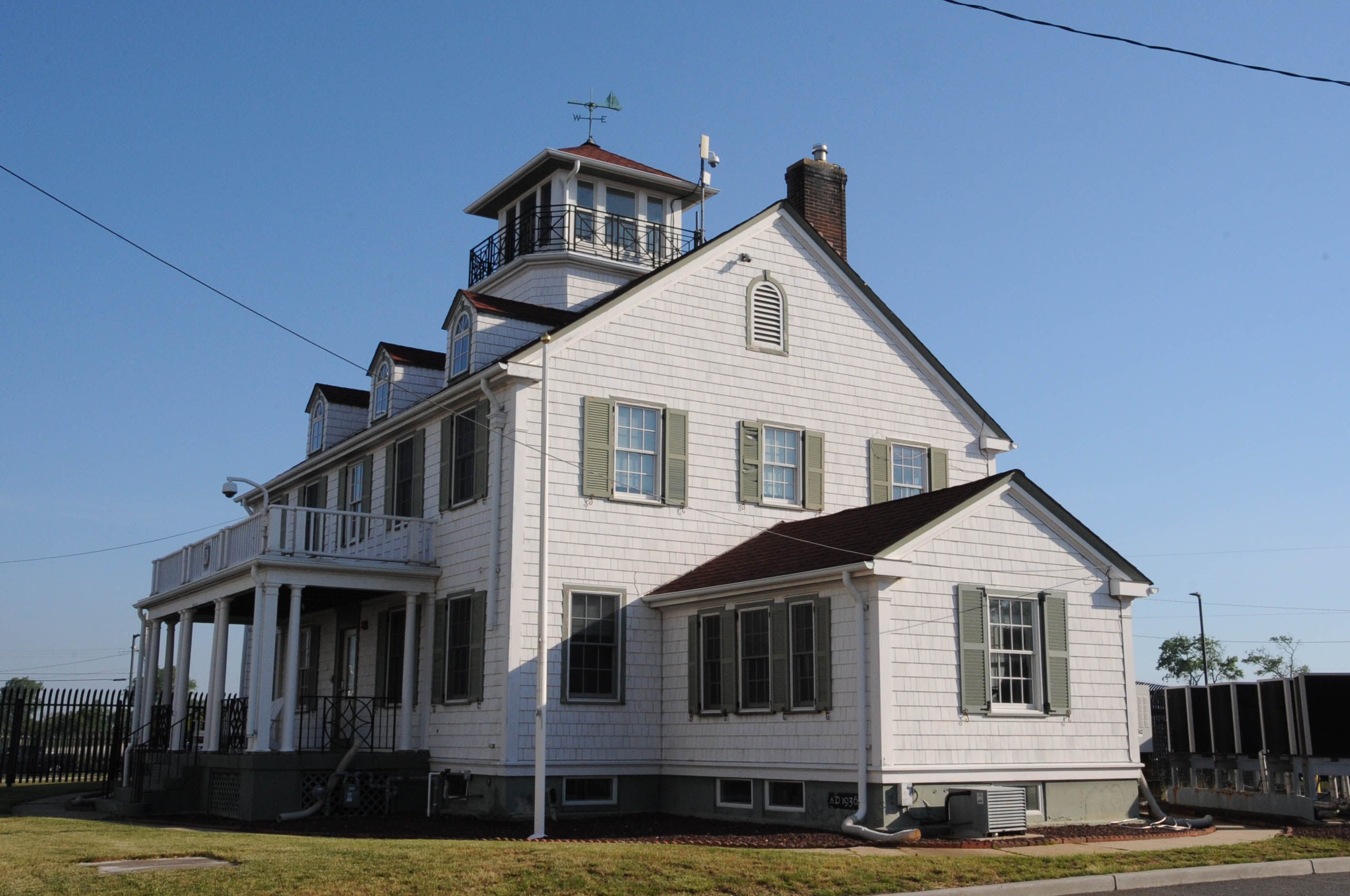

- Location within Ocean County, New Jersey Location within New Jersey Location within the United States
- Location: 40 Inlet Drive, Point Pleasant Beach, New Jersey
- Coordinates: 40°06′09.9″N 74°02′15.2″W
- Built: 1936–1937
- Architectural style: Colonial Revival
- MPS: U.S. Government Lifesaving Stations, Houses of Refuge, and pre-1950 U.S. Coast Guard Lifeboat Stations MPDF
- NRHP reference No.: 100006508
- NJRHP No.: 5812

Significant dates
- Added to NRHP: May 14, 2021
- Designated NJRHP: March 31, 2021

The Old Coast Guard Station Manasquan Inlet, also known as Coast Guard Lifeboat Station #105, is located at 40 Inlet Drive in the borough of Point Pleasant Beach in Ocean County, New Jersey, United States. Built from 1936 to 1937, the historic Colonial Revival building was added to the National Register of Historic Places on May 14, 2021, for its significance in architecture, transportation, and maritime history. It was listed as part of the U.S. Government Lifesaving Stations, Houses of Refuge, and pre-1950 U.S. Coast Guard Lifeboat Stations Multiple Property Submission (MPS).

== See also ==
- National Register of Historic Places listings in Ocean County, New Jersey
