= Captain George W. Giberson House =

- U.S. National Register of Historic Places
- New Jersey Register of Historic Places
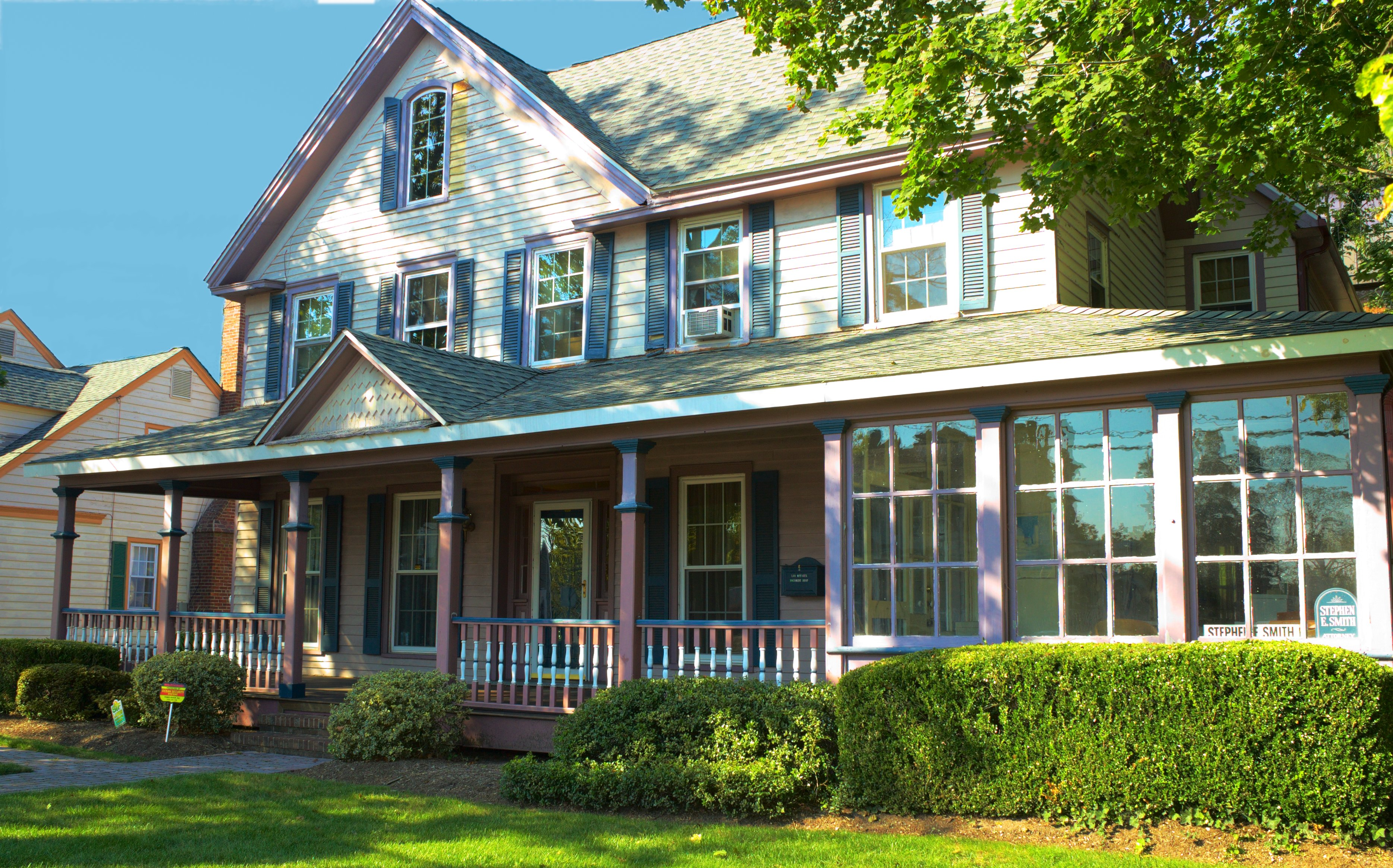

- Location within Ocean County, New Jersey Location within New Jersey Location within the United States
- Location: 54 East Water Street, Toms River, New Jersey
- Coordinates: 39°57′03″N 74°11′46″W
- Built: c. 1850–1853
- Architectural style: Vernacular Victorian
- MPS: Old Village of Toms River MRA
- NRHP reference No.: 82004693
- NJRHP No.: 2290

Significant dates
- Added to NRHP: August 12, 1982
- Designated NJRHP: June 17, 1981

The Captain George W. Giberson House is located at 54 East Water Street in Toms River in Ocean County, New Jersey, United States. The historic Victorian house was built from around 1850 to 1853. It was added to the National Register of Historic Places on August 12, 1982, for its significance in politics/government. It was listed as part of the Old Village of Toms River Multiple Property Submission (MPS).

== See also ==
- National Register of Historic Places listings in Ocean County, New Jersey
