= U.S. Life Saving Station No. 14 =

- U.S. Life Saving Station Station No. 14
- U.S. National Register of Historic Places
- New Jersey Register of Historic Places

- Location within Ocean County, New Jersey Location within New Jersey Location within the United States
- Location: Island Beach State Park, Berkeley Township, New Jersey
- Nearest city: Seaside Park, New Jersey
- Coordinates: 39°53′44.4″N 74°4′54.9″W
- Built: 1894
- Architect: Cottrell, Gallup & Co.
- Architectural style: Shingle Style
- NRHP reference No.: 78001789
- NJRHP No.: 2322

Significant dates
- Added to NRHP: January 30, 1978
- Designated NJRHP: March 7, 1977

U.S. Life Saving Station Station No. 14 is located in Island Beach State Park, near Seaside Park, in Berkeley Township of Ocean County, New Jersey, United States. The station was built in 1894. It was documented by the Historic American Buildings Survey (HABS) in 1992 and was added to the National Register of Historic Places on January 30, 1978.

== See also ==
- United States Life-Saving Service
- National Register of Historic Places listings in Ocean County, New Jersey
