= Fort Curtis (Arkansas) =

Partially-reconstructed fort in Arkansas, United States

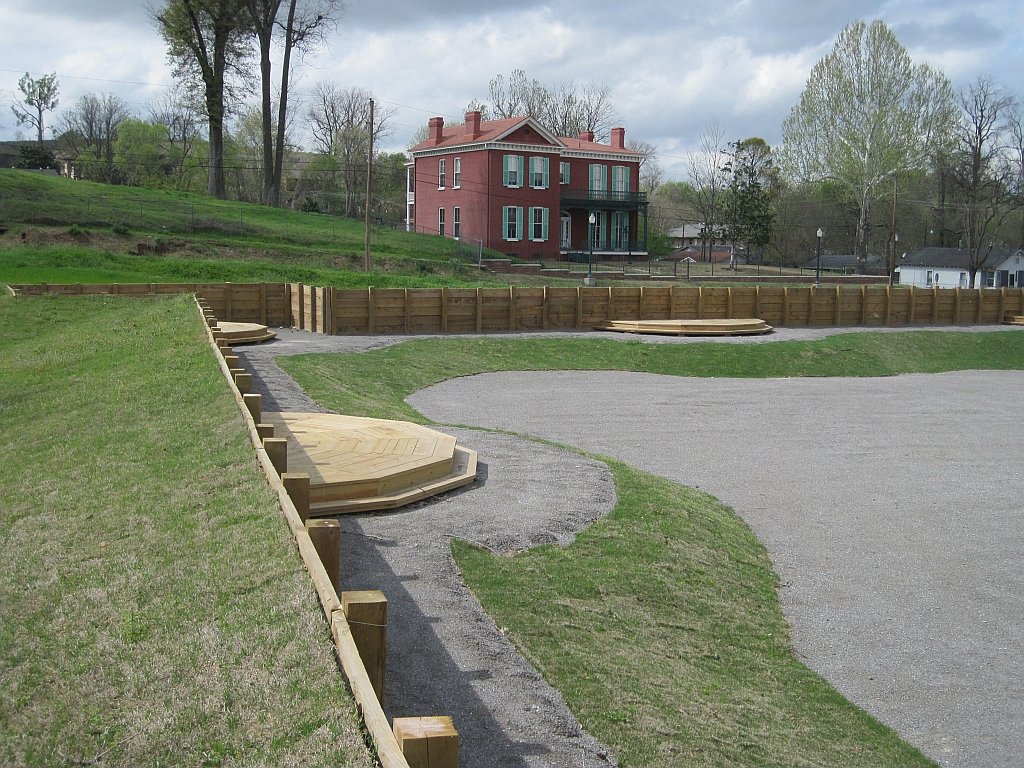
- Partially-reconstructed fortification with the Sidney H. Horner House in the background.
- Interactive map of Fort Curtis
- Alternative names: New Fort Curtis

General information
- Location: 250 Columbia Street, Helena-West Helena, Arkansas 72342, United States
- Coordinates: 34°31′32.1″N 90°35′30.4″W
- Named for: Maj. Gen. Samuel R. Curtis
- Opened: May 11, 2012

Technical details
- Material: Earth, wood

Fort Curtis is a partially-reconstructed American Civil War fortification in Helena-West Helena, Arkansas, built in 2012 to replace the original structure destroyed during Reconstruction. There is some uncertainty about both the exact armament and size of the original structure. The fort is part of the Helena Battlefield.

== Background ==
In April 1861, the American Civil War began, pitting the Union against the seceding southern states. One of the states that seceded and joined the Confederate States was the state of Arkansas. The first year of the war saw fighting north of Arkansas in the border state of Missouri, and in early March 1862, Union forces commanded by Major General Samuel R. Curtis defeated a Confederate army at the Battle of Pea Ridge in northwestern Arkansas. The next month, Curtis's men began a campaign that ended in mid-July with the Federal occupation of the Mississippi riverport town of Helena, located in eastern Arkansas.

Curtis's command, known as the Army of the Southwest, began building defenses, as they were in enemy territory. In mid-August, work on Fort Curtis, which was named after the Union commander, began. Both Union soldiers and freed slaves contributed to the construction. It was located in a position to have a commanding field of fire that covered almost all of the surrounding area. (Note: Historians David Sesser and Mark Christ state that the fort was north of town, while historians Ed Bearss and Thomas A. DeBlack relate the position of the fort to the west side of Helena.) It was completed by October 29, 1862, and a dedication ceremony held the following day. After its completion, the fort served as an important Union post in the area. The Union troops defending Helena generally believed it would provide adequate defense against an assault, but Major General Frederick Steele and Arkansas military governor John S. Phelps doubted the capabilities of the defensive fortification and had opposed its construction.

== Original structure ==
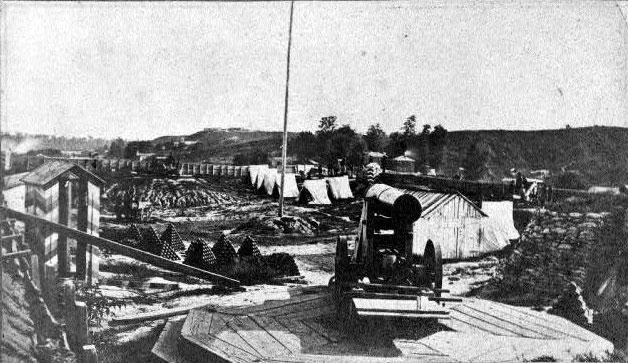
Original fortification in the 1860s.

The fort was made of earth and was shaped in a square. Two gunpowder magazines and a well were located in Fort Curtis. The exact intended armament of the fort is not known, although an archaeological investigation in the 1960s found evidence of a barbette for a 24-pounder cannon in each of the fort's four corners, as well as positions for three other cannons along the walls.

The 24-pounder guns were removed from the fort in May 1863 for use in the Vicksburg campaign. A Union soldier writing before the fort's completion state that six cannons were present and earmarked for use in Fort Curtis, of sizes ranging from 32-pounders to 64-pounders. Another Union soldier wrote two months after the fort's completion that it contained nine 32-pounder guns, while a visitor in November 1863 reported that Fort Curtis mounted a number of heavy cannons, with the largest being a 42-pounder gun. The exact size of the fort is unknown: it may have been as a large as a city block, or it could have been smaller.

In mid-1863, the Confederates decided to attack Helena in the hopes of retaking it and relieving some of the pressure on Vicksburg, Mississippi. Major General Benjamin Prentiss, the new Union commander at Fort Curtis, expected a land assault on the town and had four additional defensive earthworks built. These earthworks were known as Batteries A, B, C, and D. Fort Curtis was located east of Batteries B and C, and was positioned between the two works. At this time, the fort was armed with three 30-pounder Parrott rifles. These guns were manned by infantrymen from the 33rd Missouri Infantry Regiment. Prentiss arranged for the warning signal the garrison was under attack to be a single cannon shot from the fort.

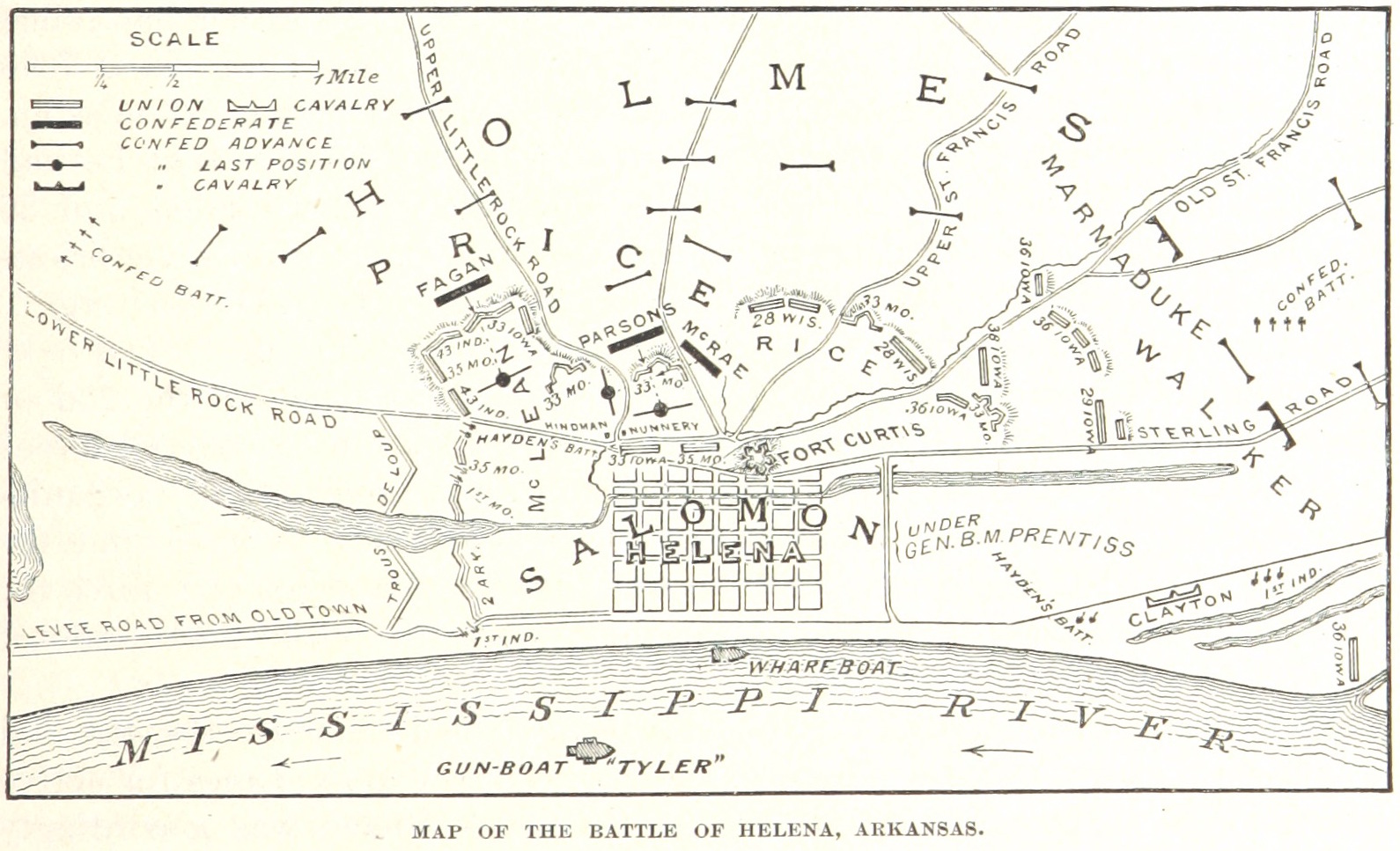
1887 map of the Battle of Helena

On the morning of July 4, the Confederates attacked. Fort Curtis fired its warning shot at about 3:30 am. Confederate attacks on both flanks were repulsed by the other batteries, but part of the Confederate force was able to overrun Battery C. Union reinforcements were rushed to the Fort Curtis area, and when Confederate troops tried to assault Fort Curtis, they were mowed down. The cannons at Fort Curtis joined with the three surviving lettered batteries and the gunboat USS Tyler in firing on the Confederates at Battery C. Defeated, the Confederates withdrew at about 10:30 am, ending the threat to Helena.

Helena was not the subject of a significant Confederate threat for the rest of the Civil War and the town served as a logistical support base until 1867 when the installation was closed, U.S. occupation forces left Helena, and the fort abandoned. What was left of the original structure was leveled in 1874, its walls used as fill, and the land subdivided into lots. The Sidney H. Horner House was built on one of those lots in the early 1880s.

== Construction ==
As part of a 2005 plan to jumpstart economic development in the area, a replica of the original structure was built. The "New Fort Curtis" was completed in 2012. This partially-reconstructed American Civil War fortification is open to the public and features exhibits, historic interpretation, and cannons.
