= Captain Amos Birdsall House =

- U.S. National Register of Historic Places
- New Jersey Register of Historic Places
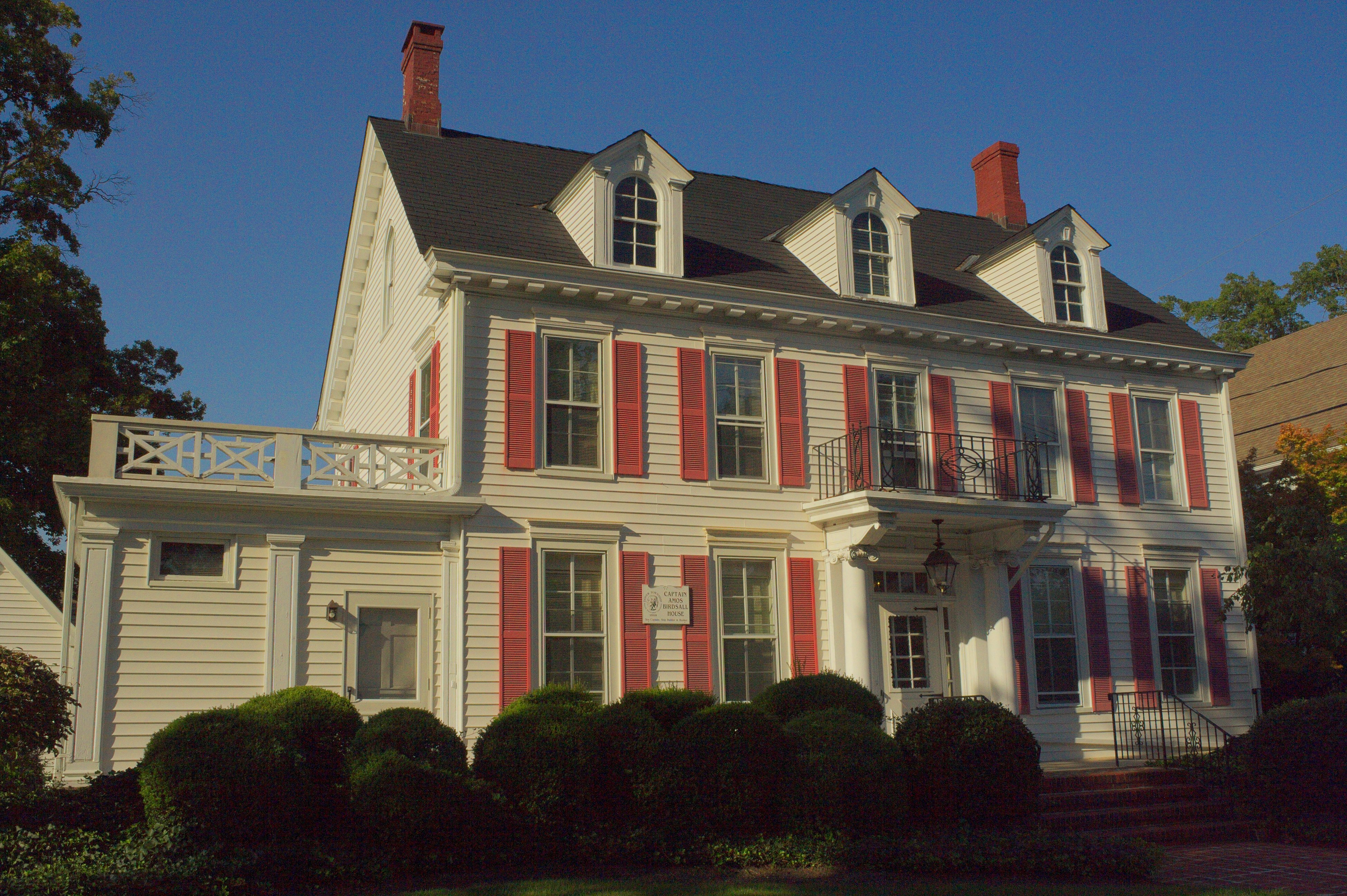

- Location within Ocean County, New Jersey Location within New Jersey Location within the United States
- Location: 234 Washington Street, Toms River, New Jersey
- Coordinates: 39°57′09″N 74°11′29″W
- Built: 1868
- Built by: Joseph A. Pharo
- Architectural style: Vernacular Colonial Revival
- MPS: Old Village of Toms River MRA
- NRHP reference No.: 82003298
- NJRHP No.: 2285

Significant dates
- Added to NRHP: May 13, 1982
- Designated NJRHP: June 17, 1981

The Captain Amos Birdsall House was located at 234 Washington Street in Toms River in Ocean County, New Jersey, United States. The historic Colonial Revival house was built in 1868. It was added to the National Register of Historic Places on May 13, 1982, for its significance in social history. It was destroyed by fire on May 31, 2016.

== See also ==
- National Register of Historic Places listings in Ocean County, New Jersey
