= Mary Etta Cox House =

- U.S. National Register of Historic Places
- New Jersey Register of Historic Places
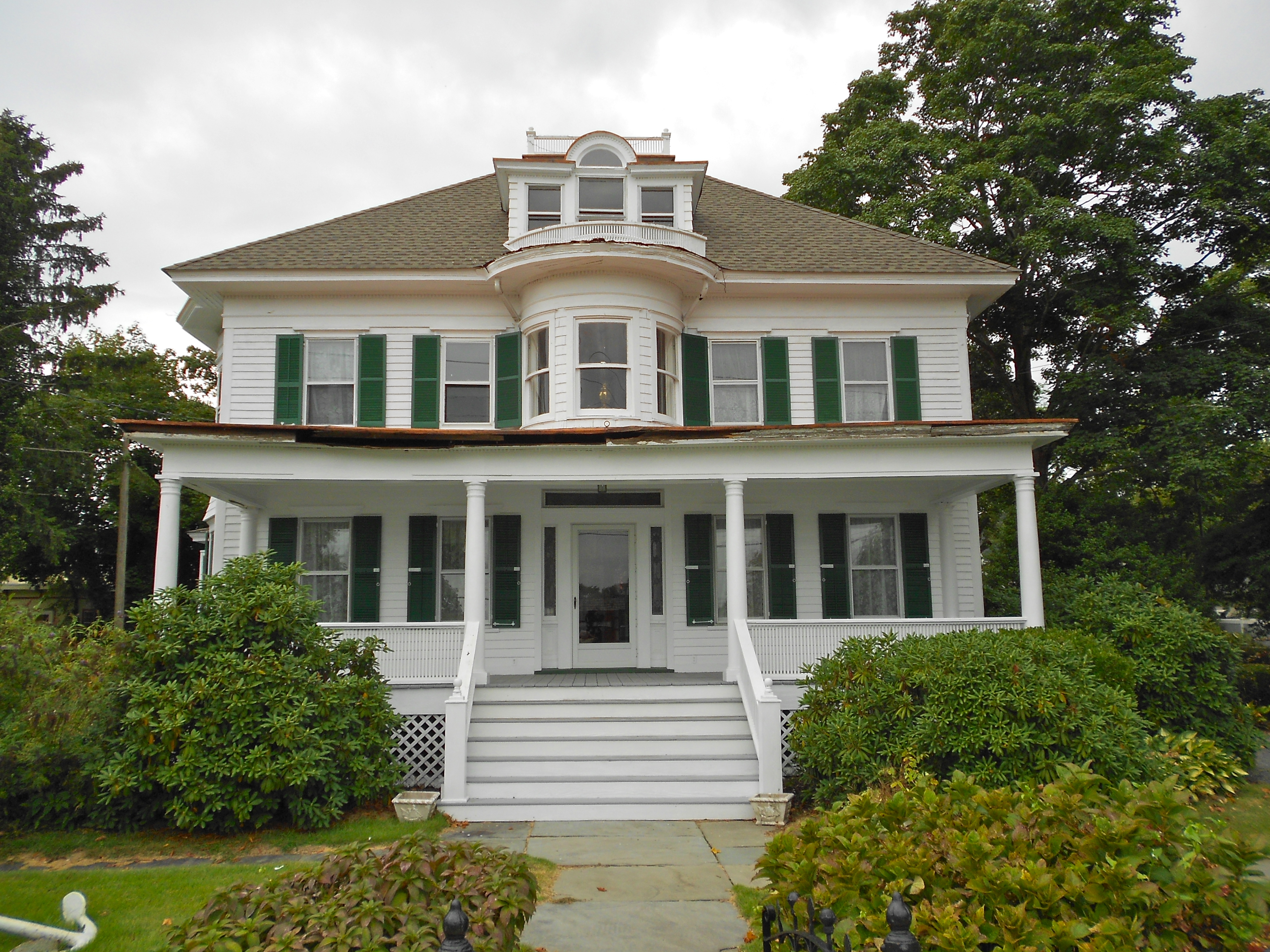

- Location within Ocean County, New Jersey Location within New Jersey Location within the United States
- Location: 353 North Main Street, Barnegat Township, New Jersey
- Coordinates: 39°45′13″N 74°13′26″W
- Built: c. 1829
- Built by: H. W. Tolbert
- Architectural style: Queen Anne, Colonial Revival
- NRHP reference No.: 05000124
- NJRHP No.: 4391

Significant dates
- Added to NRHP: March 9, 2005
- Designated NJRHP: January 6, 2005

The Mary Etta Cox House is a historic house located at 353 North Main Street in Barnegat Township in Ocean County, New Jersey, United States. The oldest section of the house dates to c. 1829. It was added to the National Register of Historic Places on March 9, 2005, for its significance in architecture.

== History and description ==
The house is a two-story frame building featuring both Colonial Revival and Queen Anne styles. The house has a Palladian dormer and the front porch has Doric columns. The house was built in two stages, in c. 1829 and in c. 1848 when purchased by William Cox, a prominent businessman, also known as Captain Cox. In 1904, his wife, Mary Etta, enlarged and renovated the house.

== See also ==
- National Register of Historic Places listings in Ocean County, New Jersey
