= Falkinburg Farmstead =

- U.S. National Register of Historic Places
- New Jersey Register of Historic Places
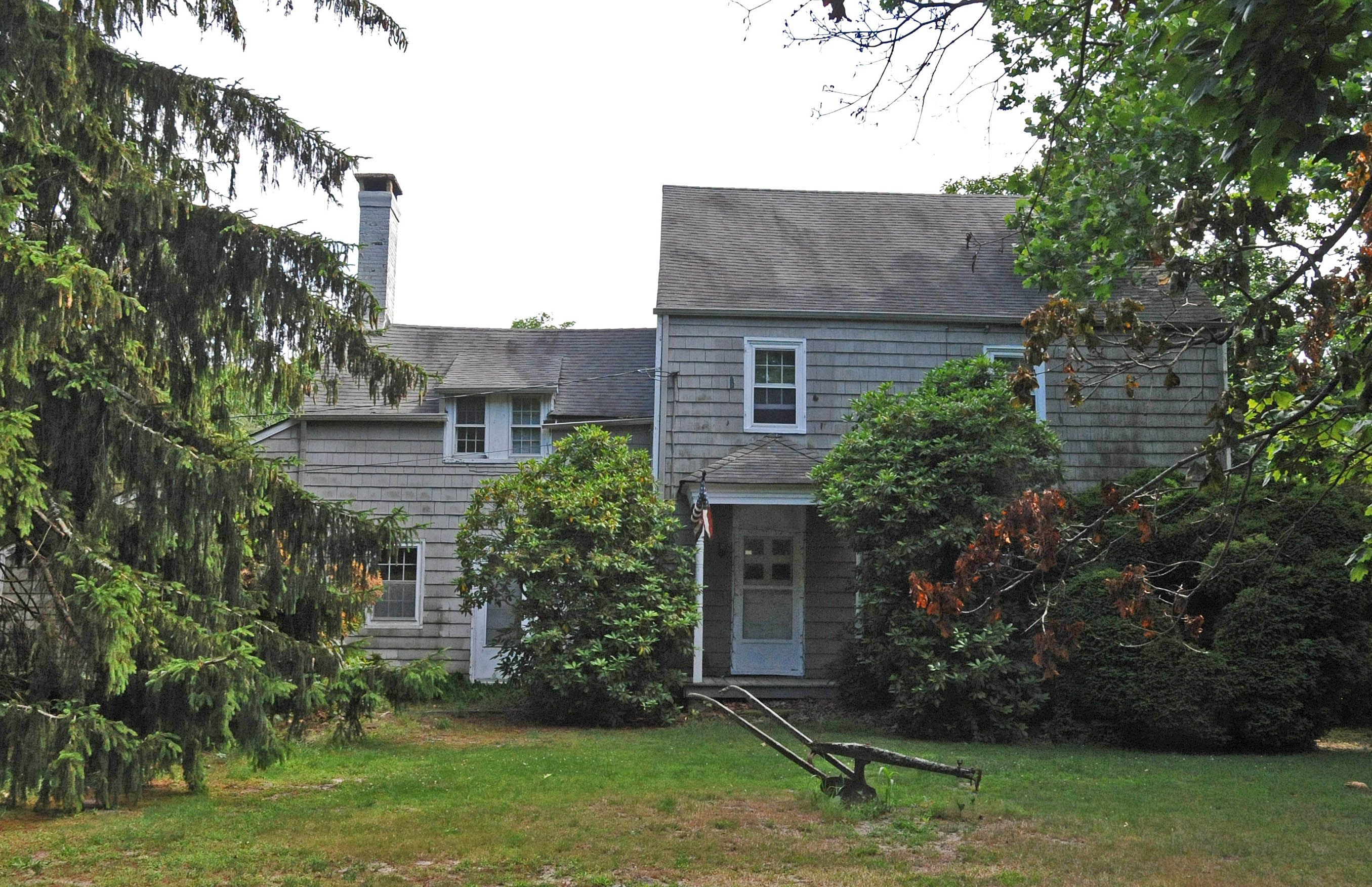

- Location within Ocean County, New Jersey Location within New Jersey Location within the United States
- Location: 28 Westcott Avenue, Waretown, New Jersey
- Coordinates: 39°47′03″N 74°11′35″W
- Area: 4.3 acres (1.7 ha)
- Built: 1732
- Architectural style: Greek Revival, Colonial, Federal
- NRHP reference No.: 93000829
- NJRHP No.: 2318

Significant dates
- Added to NRHP: August 12, 1993
- Designated NJRHP: July 7, 1993

The Falkinburg Farmstead is located at 28 Westcott Avenue in the Waretown section of Ocean Township in Ocean County, New Jersey, United States. The oldest section of the farmhouse was built in 1732. It was added to the National Register of Historic Places on August 12, 1993, for its significance in architecture and exploration/settlement.

== See also ==
- National Register of Historic Places listings in Ocean County, New Jersey
