= Sidney H. Horner House =

Historic house in Arkansas, United States

- Horner-Gladin House
- U.S. National Register of Historic Places
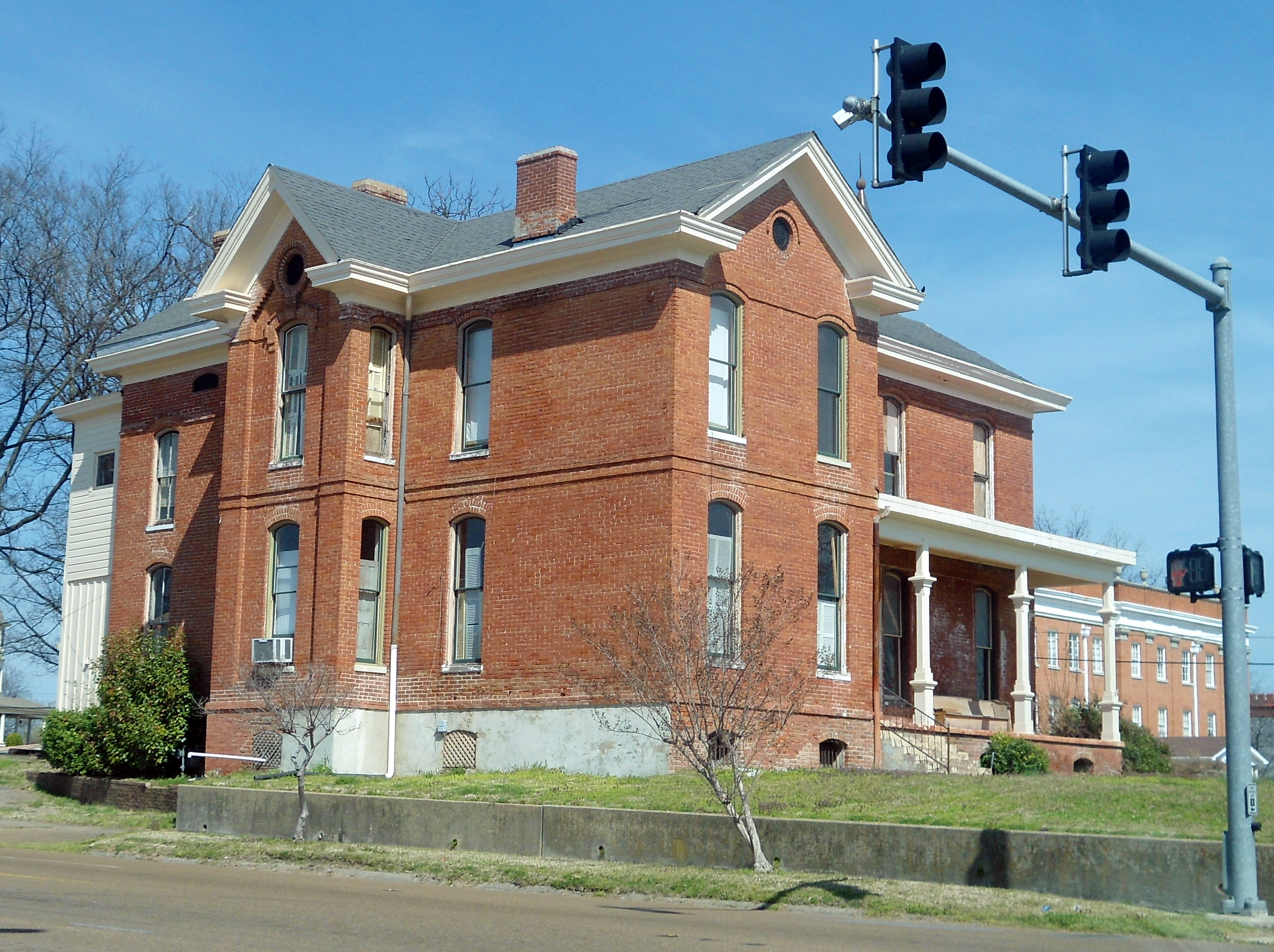
- Main façade of Sidney H. Horner House

- Location within Arkansas
- Location: 626 Porter Street; Helena, Arkansas
- Nearest city: Helena-West Helena
- Coordinates: 34°31′45″N 90°35′24″W
- Built: 1881
- Architect: Michael Brennam
- Architectural style: Italianate
- NRHP reference No.: 75000401
- Added to NRHP: December 4, 1975

The Sidney H. Horner House was built in 1881 by Michael Brennam, an early builder/architect, approximately six blocks to the west of the Mississippi River in Helena, Arkansas. Sidney H. Horner, a member of an early Helena family, was part of a banking firm established by his father, John Sidney Horner. The Italianate style house is made of hand-molded brick. The home has 7 fireplaces and oak parquet floors. The initial footprint of the house was expanded in 1895 with a two-story east wing also made of brick. At the same time, the original small front porch was expanded to run the entire length of the new east addition. Electric lights were also added at about this time.

== History ==
=== 19th century ===
The house was constructed on a site that had been part of Fort Curtis, a Union Army post which saw considerable action during the Battle of Helena The battle was a belated effort by the Confederate Army to seize Union-occupied Helena. It was an attempt to relieve the city of Vicksburg, Mississippi from the long siege on the city by Union forces led by General Ulysses S. Grant.

=== Early 20th century ===
Sidney H. Horner died in 1900 leaving a widow and 7 children. The house was sold to settle his estate and it passed through several owners who made various changes to the house. A back porch was added in 1900. Indoor plumbing was added during the 1920s. At some point before the 1930s, the roof of the front porch that started with the east-wing addition of 1895, was completely removed. This left the porch roof as it had existed when the house was first built. The base of the front porch, starting with the east-wing addition, was retained and used as a patio.

=== Mid-20th-century ===
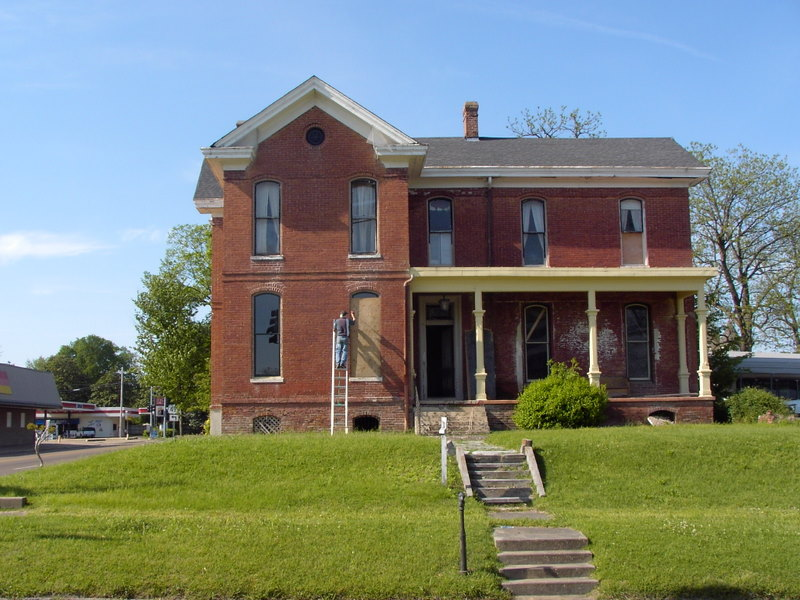
Horner-Gladin House in 2009 during restoration

Ivey Gladin was a well-known photographer in the Mississippi Delta, starting his own photography studio in 1939. He served in the US Navy during World War II. His wife, Morvene, operated the studio while he was performing military service. After his return from the war, they purchased the house with another couple with a loan that was referred to as a "GI Bill partnership home loan." Local historians suggest that this was the first loan of this type made in the United States after the war. The home was changed to a duplex in order to qualify for the loan. This particular program was set up after World War II to encourage returning veterans to find and purchase multi-family housing in an effort to reduce the shortage of housing in the initial post war years. After a few years, the Gladin family bought out the interest of the James family. The home was then converted into their photography studio as well as making it the residence for their family. The Gladin Photography Studio remained open in the house for almost 50 years. A collection of approximately 100,000 of Mr. Glavins photos is now part of a collection held by the University of Mississippi at Oxford, Mississippi . Ivey Gladin is well known among blues enthusiasts for his photographs of Sonny Boy Williamson performing on the King Biscuit Time radio program. Ivey (d. 2001) and Morvene (d. 2008) Gladin lived in the house until 1999. The house sat vacant for two years and deferred maintenance caused damage to the home.

=== Today ===
In 2001, the house was sold by the heirs of the Gladin family to a pair of preservation-minded individuals who started a piece-meal restoration effort. The front porch was rebuilt to its original 1890s configuration. A window restoration project began utilizing the skills of Ronnie Walker, a graduate of the local Phillips Community College's Building Preservation Trades Program who went on to oversee the restoration of Lakeport Plantation near Lake Village, Arkansas. Work on the house was delayed when one of the new owners was mobilized with the 39th Infantry Brigade of the Arkansas Army National Guard for service in Iraq and later during Katrina relief efforts in New Orleans. A new window restoration project was started in the winter of 2008 and is ongoing.

The structure is known today as the Horner-Gladin House and is on the National Register of Historic Places.

== Images ==
Horner-Gladin House, 1930s.

Horner-Gladin House, 1960s.

== See also ==
- National Register of Historic Places listings in Phillips County, Arkansas
