= Horner–Hyde House =

Historic house in South Dakota, United States

- U.S. National Register of Historic Places
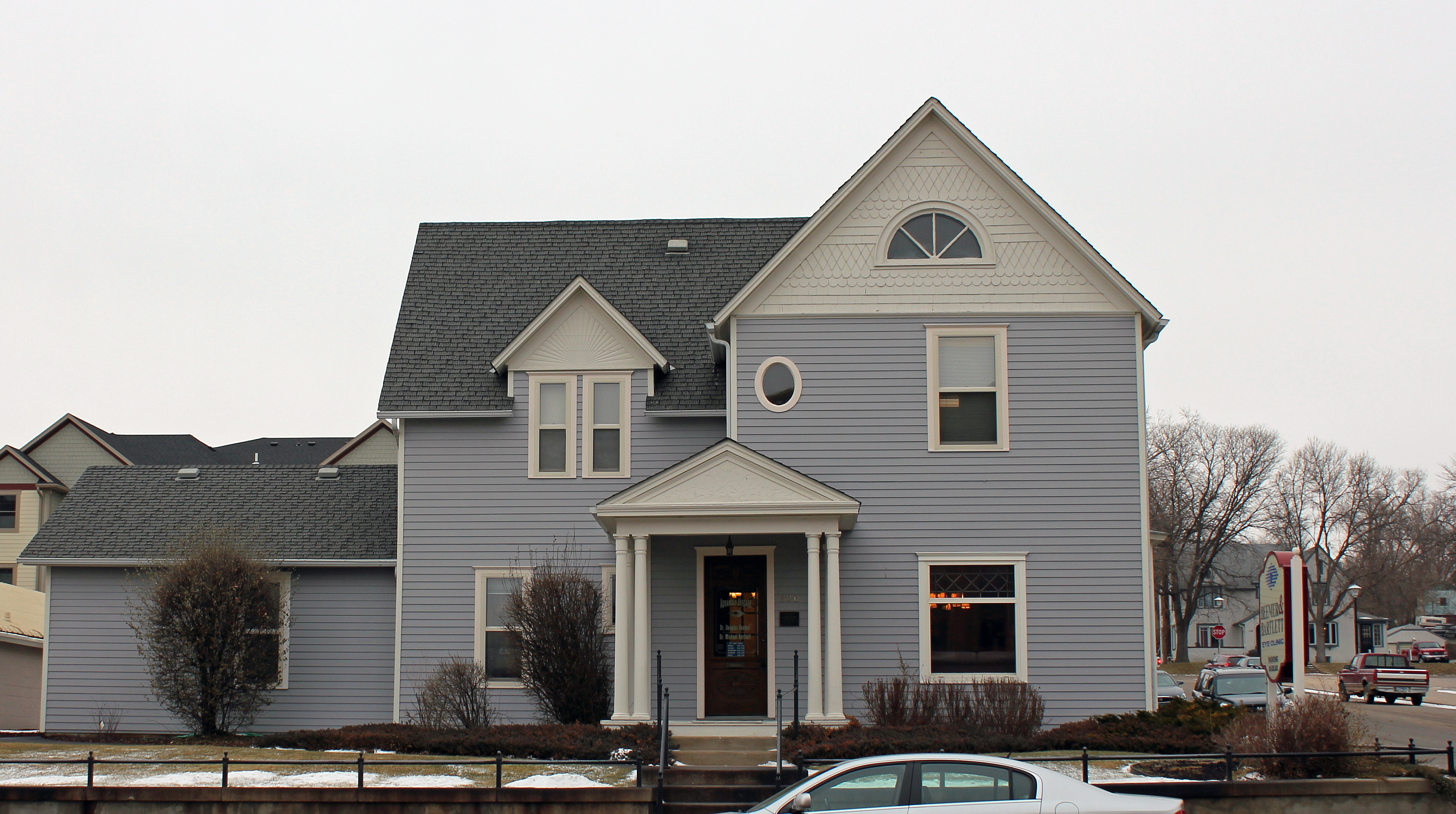

- Location within South Dakota Location within the United States
- Location: 100 W. Capitol Ave., Pierre, South Dakota
- Coordinates: 44°22′10″N 100°21′5″W
- Area: less than one acre
- Built: 1889
- Architectural style: Queen Anne
- NRHP reference No.: 88002836
- Added to NRHP: December 20, 1988

The Horner–Hyde House is a historic house located at 100 W. Capitol Ave. in Pierre, South Dakota. Henry Horner started building the house in 1889 and continued adding to it until 1913. The Queen Anne house features shingle siding in its gables, a cross gabled roof, and a bay window on its east side. While living in the house, Horner was a prominent attorney and real estate dealer who served two terms in the South Dakota Senate. After Horner died in 1930, Charles Lee Hyde bought the house. Hyde came from a family of wealthy real estate developers; in addition to managing the family's land, Hyde served in the South Dakota Senate and House of Representatives and helped lead local youth groups.

The house was added to the National Register of Historic Places on December 20, 1988.
