= Horner House (Toms River, New Jersey) =

- U.S. National Register of Historic Places
- New Jersey Register of Historic Places
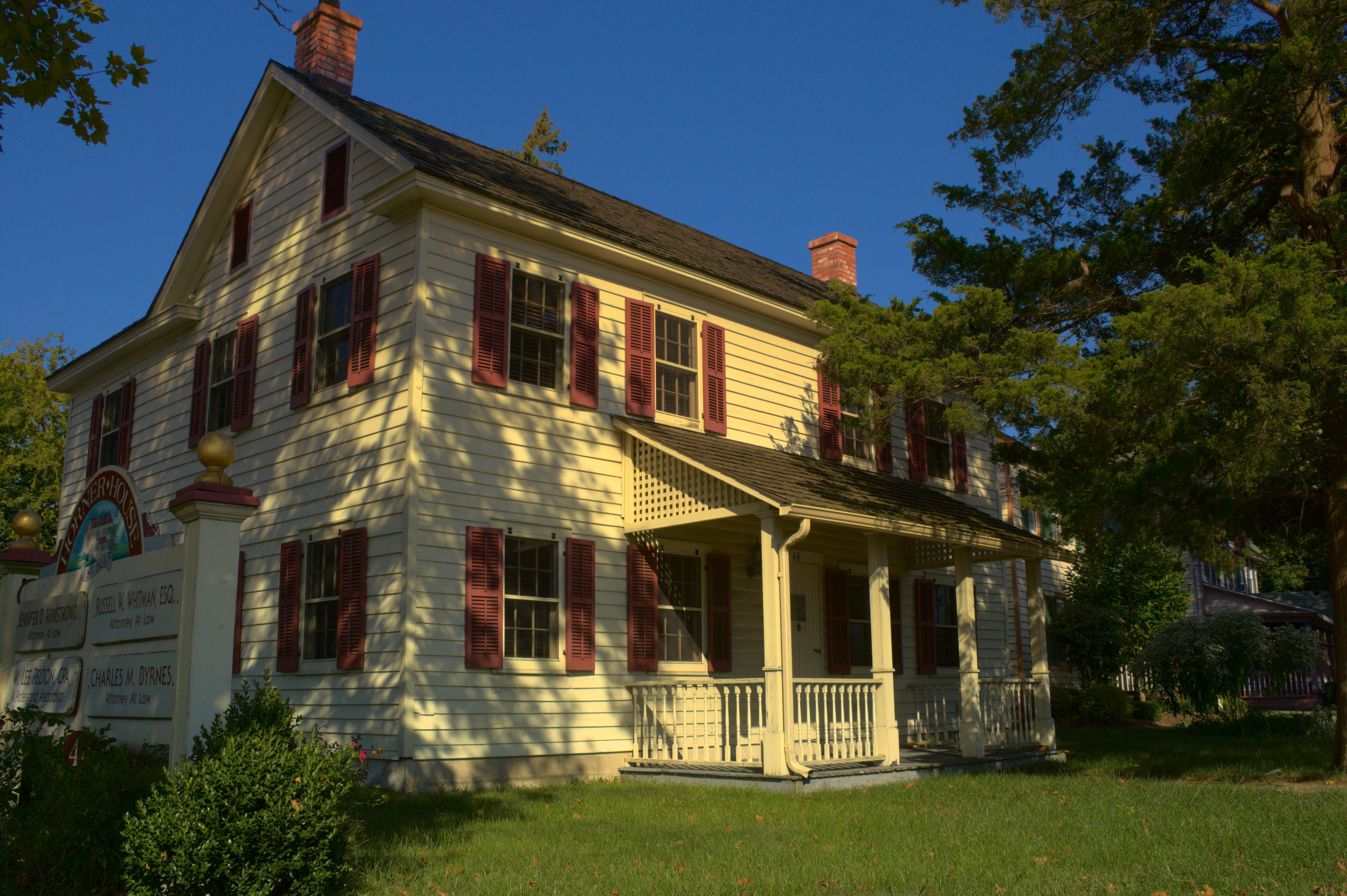

- Location within Ocean County, New Jersey Location within New Jersey Location within the United States
- Location: 44 East Water Street, Toms River, New Jersey
- Coordinates: 39°57′04″N 74°11′47″W
- Built: c. 1824
- Architectural style: Vernacular Georgian Revival
- MPS: Old Village of Toms River MRA
- NRHP reference No.: 82003296
- NJRHP No.: 2291

Significant dates
- Added to NRHP: May 13, 1982
- Designated NJRHP: June 17, 1981

The Horner House is located at 44 East Water Street in Toms River in Ocean County, New Jersey, United States. The historic Georgian Revival house was built around 1824 by Captain Stephen Gulick. It was added to the National Register of Historic Places on May 13, 1982, for its significance in architecture and maritime history. It was listed as part of the Old Village of Toms River Multiple Property Submission (MPS).

== See also ==
- National Register of Historic Places listings in Ocean County, New Jersey
