= Ocean County Jail =

- U.S. National Register of Historic Places
- New Jersey Register of Historic Places
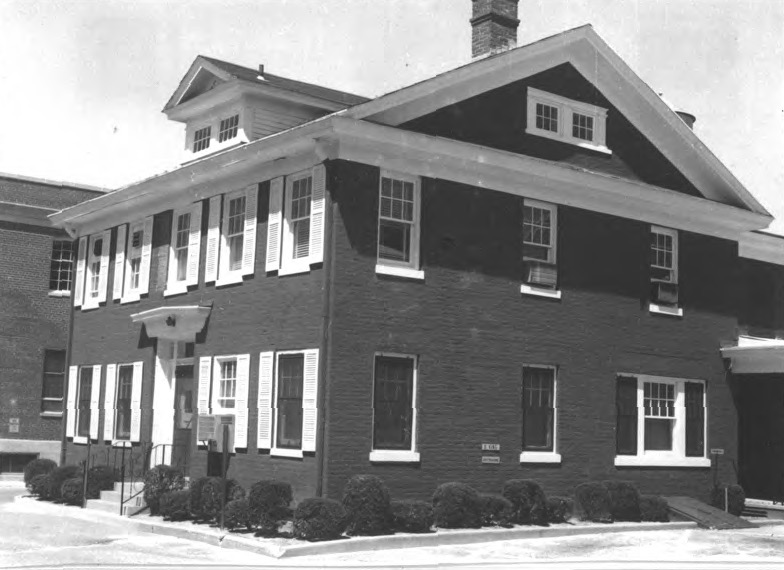
- Photo from 1978

- Location within Ocean County, New Jersey Location within New Jersey Location within the United States
- Location: Sheriff Street, Toms River, New Jersey
- Coordinates: 39°57′12″N 74°11′41.3″W
- Built: 1851
- Architectural style: Greek Revival, Federal, Vernacular Federal
- MPS: Old Village of Toms River MRA
- NRHP reference No.: 83001611
- NJRHP No.: 2293

Significant dates
- Added to NRHP: August 16, 1983
- Designated NJRHP: June 17, 1981

The Ocean County Jail was located on Sheriff Street in Toms River in Ocean County, New Jersey, United States. It was built in 1851, behind the Ocean County Courthouse, and was both the county jail and the sheriff's house. The historic brick building was added to the National Register of Historic Places on May 13, 1982, for its significance in architecture and politics/government. It was listed as part of the Old Village of Toms River Multiple Property Submission (MPS). It was approved to be demolished in 2014, and scheduled to be demolished in 2019.

== See also ==
- National Register of Historic Places listings in Ocean County, New Jersey
