= Horners, Virginia =

Unincorporated community in Virginia, US

Coordinates: 38°06′43″N 76°56′49″W

Horners is an unincorporated community in Westmoreland County, in the U. S. state of Virginia.
