= Mörner =

Mörner is a Swedish surname. Notable people with the surname include:

- Axel Otto Mörner (1774–1852), Swedish artist and general
- Birger Mörner, Swedish diplomat, author and collector
- Carl Otto Mörner, Swedish courtier
- Carl Carlsson Mörner, Swedish politician
- Earl Stanley Morner better known by his stagename Dennis Morgan (1908–1994), American actor
- Hedvig Mörner (1672–1753), Swedish courtier
- Helmer Mörner, Swedish horse rider
- Nils-Axel Mörner, Swedish scientist and climate change denier
