= Druin–Horner House =

Historic house in Virginia, United States

- U.S. National Register of Historic Places
- Virginia Landmarks Register
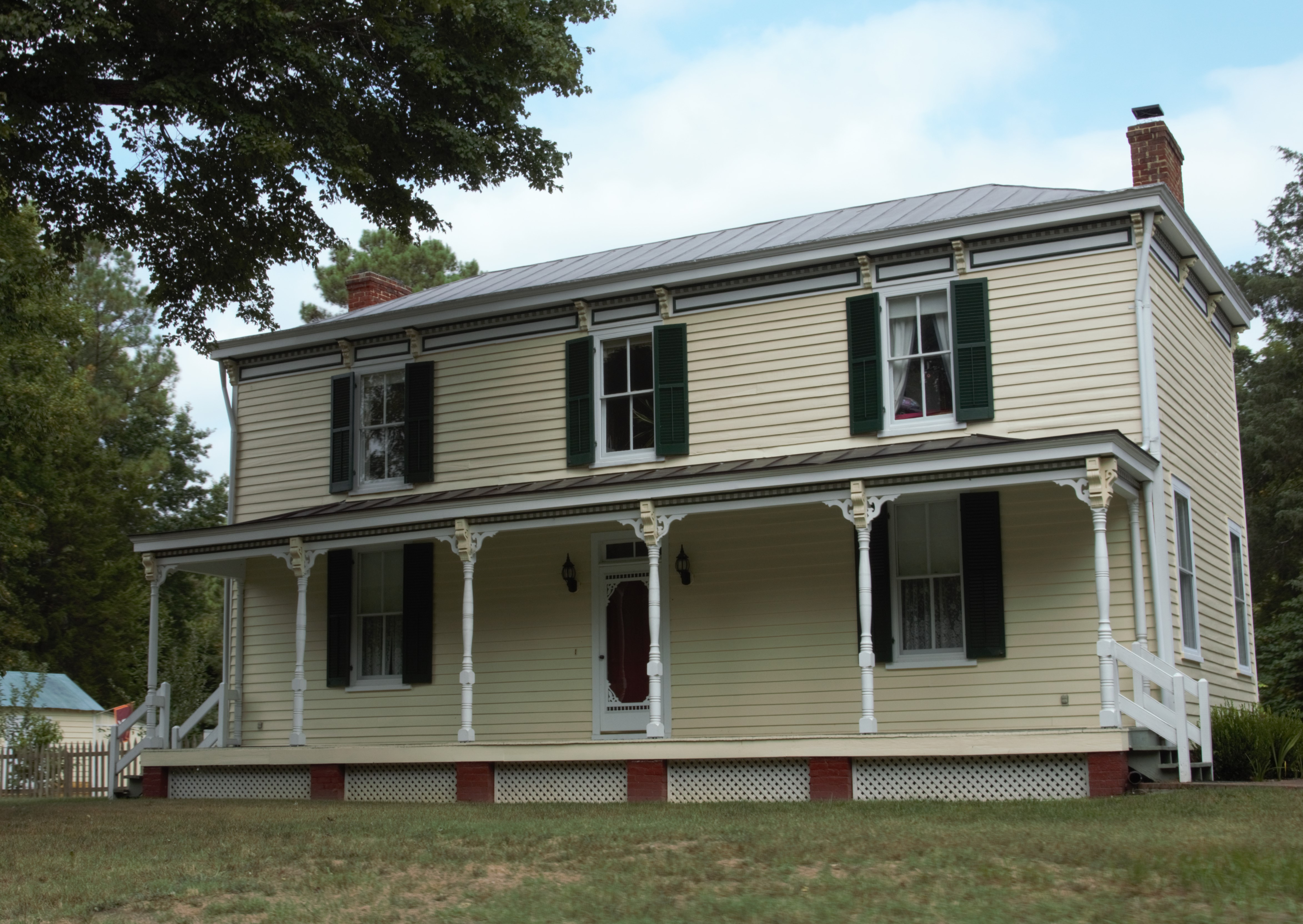

- Location within Virginia Location within the United States
- Nearest city: 9904 River Rd., Richmond, Virginia
- Coordinates: 37°35′9.44″N 77°36′38.12″W
- NRHP reference No.: 09000064
- VLR No.: 043-0302

Significant dates
- Added to NRHP: 25 February 2009
- Designated VLR: 18 December 2008

The Druin–Horner House near Richmond in Henrico County, Virginia, USA, was listed on the National Register of Historic Places in 2009.

It is "a rare survivor from 18th century Henrico". It is featured in Foundations in Time II: More of Henrico’s Architectural Treasures, a Henrico County TV film available for viewing online.
