= Horner sign =

Two medical signs are sometimes called the Horner sign or Horner's sign:

- The absence of pupil dilation in Horner's syndrome (creating mismatched pupils when unilateral)
- An appearance on a radiograph that indicates fetal demise in utero (also called the Spalding sign)
