= Laurelton, New Jersey =

Populated place in Ocean County, New Jersey, US

- Unincorporated community
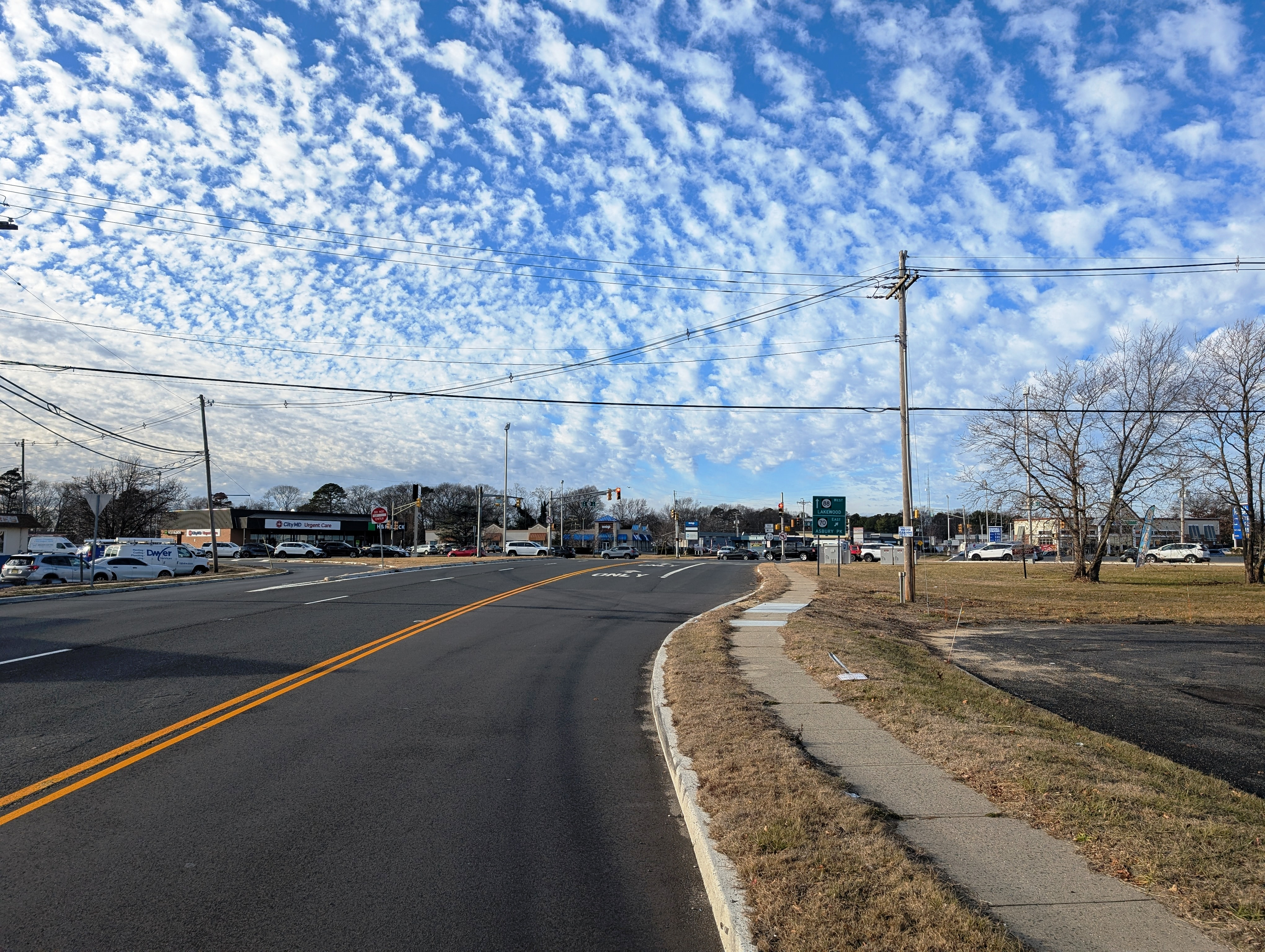
- Intersection of Route 70 and Route 88 in Laurelton

- Laurelton's location in Ocean County (Inset: Ocean County in New Jersey) Laurelton, New Jersey (New Jersey) Laurelton, New Jersey (the United States)
- Coordinates: 40°04′07″N 74°07′50″W
- Country: United States
- State: New Jersey
- County: Ocean
- Township: Brick
- Elevation: 30 ft (9 m)
- GNIS feature ID: 877693

Laurelton is an unincorporated community located within Brick Township in Ocean County, in the U.S. state of New Jersey.

Settlement in the area dates back to the years after 1808, when an iron forge in the area became the nucleus of a community called Burrsville, which was named for one of the proprietors. The area became known as Laurelton in the early 1900s with the opening of Laurelton Farms, a poultry operation run by the Park and Tilford Company.

A failed 1963 referendum would have renamed the entire Brick Township after Laurelton.
