= Cedar Bridge Tavern =

- Cedar Bridge Tavern County Historic Site
- U.S. National Register of Historic Places
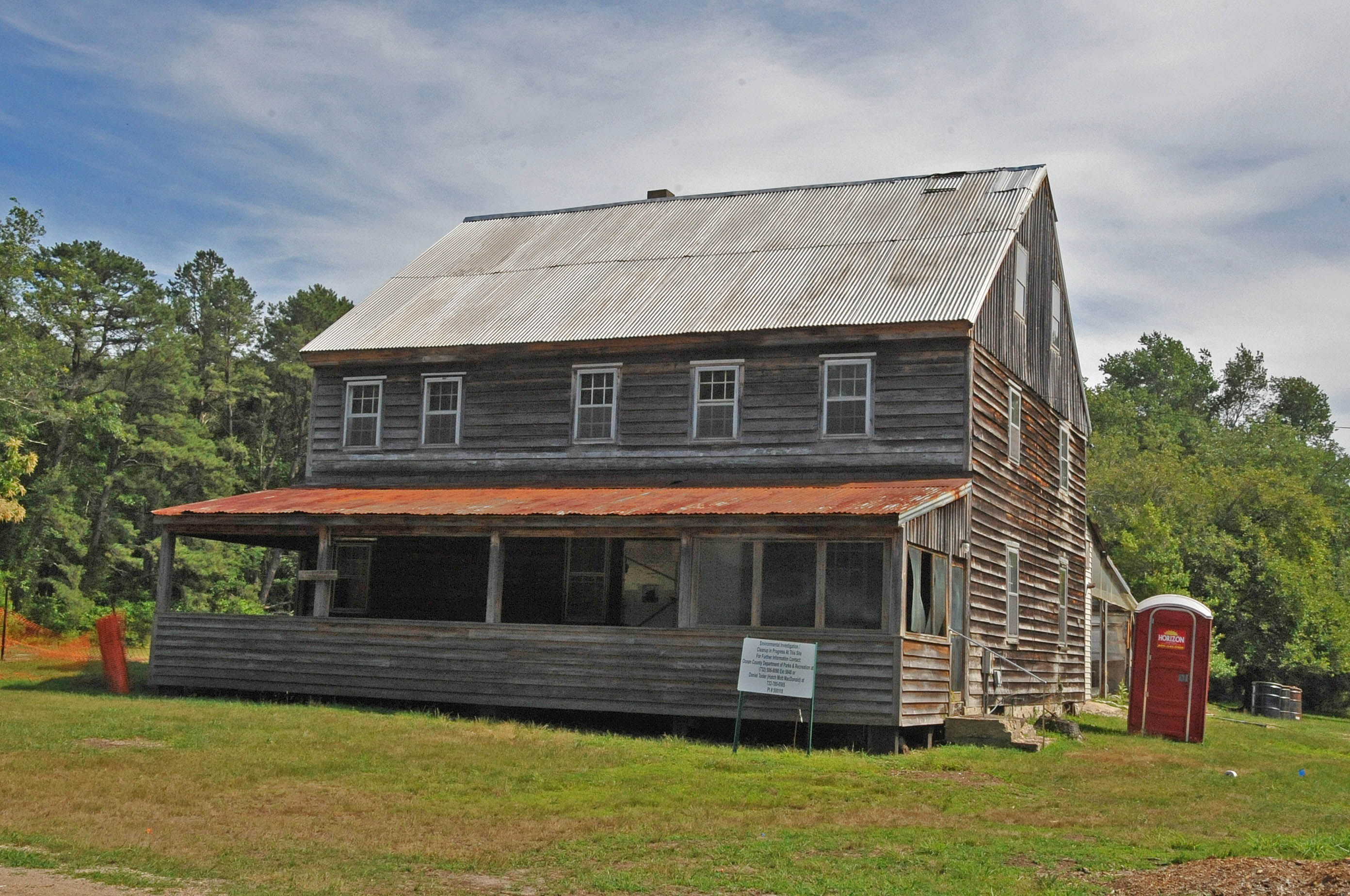
- Cedar Bridge Tavern County Historic Site, Barnegat Township, New Jersey

- Location within Ocean County, New Jersey Location within New Jersey Location within the United States
- Location: 200 Old Halfway Road, Barnegat Township, New Jersey
- Coordinates: 39.7833°N 74.3605°W
- Area: 311 acres (126 ha)
- Built: ca. 1816
- Architectural style: Federal
- NRHP reference No.: 13000586
- Added to NRHP: August 7, 2013

The Cedar Bridge Tavern County Historic Site is a historic tavern located in the New Jersey Pine Barrens in Barnegat Township. It is the second tavern on the site and was built circa 1816 and is believed to have one of the oldest standing bars in New Jersey. It is located at the site of the last purported skirmish of the American Revolutionary War called the Affair at Cedar Bridge Creek on December 27, 1782. It is on the National Register of Historic Places. Besides the tavern there are 3.5 miles of trails and events throughout the year available through the Ocean County Parks & Recreation Department.

== History ==
=== The Affair at Cedar Bridge ===
While the Siege of Yorktown and surrender by Cornwallis is considered the last major conflict on American soil during the American Revolution, dozens of small engagements and skirmishes took place up to the signing of the Treaty of Paris. The last conflict took place on the Jersey Shore in 1782.

On December 27, 1782, forces for the new republic led by Captains Richard Shreve and Edward Thomas were informed that notorious Loyalist John Bacon was in the vicinity of the tavern. They engaged Bacon and his Loyalist bandits (known now as "Refugees") at Cedar Bridge. A brief exchange of gunfire took place, and Bacon and his men were able to escape. One Patriot was killed, and four were wounded. Four Loyalists were wounded, including Bacon.

== Historic site ==
According to a 1981 survey by preservationists working with the New Jersey Office of Cultural and Environmental Services, the Cedar Bridge Tavern was estimated to have been built around 1740 close to a stage coach route between Camden and the Jersey Shore. The wood-sided tavern with the long front porch has served as a hotel, restaurant and bar for travelers. Ocean County purchased the property from its last owner, Rudolf Koenig, in 2008 for $120,000. The structure still sits on dirt road and is surrounded by pine trees. It was added to the National Register of Historic Places on August 7, 2013. Ocean County is spending $2.2 million to refurbish and develop the site, including building a caretaker's cottage and an outdoor classroom facility.

== Historical reenactment ==
The "Affair at Cedar Bridge" is reenacted each year on the first Sunday in December. The event is from 10am - 4pm. With two times for the reenactment 12pm and 2pm respectively.
