= Horner =

Horner may refer to:

== Titles ==
- Someone from the Horn of Africa

== Places ==
- Horner, Somerset, England, UK
- River Horner, Somerset, England, UK, also known as Horner Water
- Horner, West Virginia, US, an unincorporated community
- Horner site, Wyoming, US, an archaeological site
- Horner Nunatak, Antarctica, a nunatak

== Schools ==
- Horner Junior High School, Fremont, California, US
- Horner Institute (1902-1913) a private school in Missouri, US
- Horner Institute for of Fine Arts, in Kansas City, Missouri
- Horner Military Academy, a defunct private educational institution in North Carolina, US
- Franklin Horner Middle School, Toronto, Ontario, Canada

== Science and technology ==
- USS Horner, a Union Navy steamer in the American Civil War
- Horner Museum, Gill Coliseum, Oregon State University, Corvallis, Oregon, US
- Horner's syndrome, a neurological disease
- Horner's method, in mathematics
- Cape Horner, a ship capable of rounding Cape Horn

== Popular culture ==
- Horner Rennbahn (German: Horner Track), Horn, Hamburg, Germany; a racehorse circuit
- Little Jack Horner, a nursery rhyme
- the title character of "Little Jack Horner", a nursery rhyme
- "Big" Jack Horner, the main antagonist of the animated feature film Puss in Boots: The Last Wish
- Jack Horner, the porn director in the 1997 film Boogie Nights
- Jack Horner (comics), a character from the comic book Fables
- John Horner, in "The Adventure of the Blue Carbuncle", a Sherlock Holmes story by Sir Arthur Conan Doyle
- Nicole Horner, a main character in the French film Les Diaboliques and the American remake Diabolique
- Thomas Horner, an armorer in the play Henry VI, Part 2 by Shakespeare

== Geography ==
- Horner Ballpark, Dallas, Texas, USA; a ballpark
- Horner Avenue, Alderwood, Toronto, Ontario, Canada

== Other uses ==
- Horner (surname)

== See also ==
- Horner sign (disambiguation)
- Horner House (disambiguation)
