= Westfield Public Schools =

School district in Union County, New Jersey, US

Address
- 302 Elm Street Westfield, Union County, New Jersey, 07090; United States
- Coordinates: 40.654118°N 74.352339°W

District information
- Grades: PreK-12
- Superintendent: Raymond A. González
- Business administrator: Patricia Ramos
- Schools: 10

Students and staff
- Enrollment: 5,979 (as of 2023–24)
- Faculty: 498.1 FTEs
- Student–teacher ratio: 12.0:1

Other information
- District Factor Group: I
- Website: www.westfieldnjk12.org
Ind.	Per pupil	District spending	Rank (*)	K-12 average	%± vs. average
1A	Total Spending	$16,607	25	$18,891	−12.1%
1	Budgetary Cost	13,087	26	14,783	−11.5%
2	Classroom Instruction	7,946	20	8,763	−9.3%
6	Support Services	2,364	56	2,392	−1.2%
8	Administrative Cost	1,389	41	1,485	−6.5%
10	Operations & Maintenance	1,098	4	1,783	−38.4%
13	Extracurricular Activities	290	68	268	8.2%
16	Median Teacher Salary	71,908	83	64,043
Data from NJDoE 2014 Taxpayers' Guide to Education Spending. *Of K-12 districts with more than 3,500 students. Lowest spending=1; Highest=103

The Westfield Public Schools is a comprehensive community public school district that serves students in pre-kindergarten through twelfth grade from Westfield, in Union County, in the U.S. state of New Jersey.

As of the 2023–24 school year, the district, comprised of 10 schools, had an enrollment of 5,979 students and 498.1 classroom teachers (on an FTE basis), for a student–teacher ratio of 12.0:1.

The district had been classified by the New Jersey Department of Education as being in District Factor Group "I", the second-highest of eight groupings. District Factor Groups organize districts statewide to allow comparison by common socioeconomic characteristics of the local districts. From lowest socioeconomic status to highest, the categories are A, B, CD, DE, FG, GH, I and J.

== Awards and recognition ==
Theodore Roosevelt Intermediate School was awarded the National Blue Ribbon School Award of Excellence by the United States Department of Education, the highest award an American school can receive, during the 2004-05 school year. Washington Elementary School was honored by the National Blue Ribbon Schools Program in 2019, one of nine schools in the state recognized as Exemplary High Performing Schools.

For the 1994-95 school year, Westfield High School was named as a "Star School" by the New Jersey Department of Education, the highest honor that a New Jersey school can achieve.

== Schools ==
The district has a central kindergarten, six neighborhood elementary schools (grades 1-5), two middle schools (grades 6-8) divided by a "North Side / South Side" boundary, and one high school (grades 9-12). The schools in the district (with 2023–24 enrollment data from the National Center for Education Statistics) are:

Early childhood

- Lincoln Early Childhood Center (with 260 students; in grades PreK-K)
  - Tiffany Jacobson, principal

Elementary schools

- Franklin Elementary School (531; 1-5 - North)
  - Paul Duncan, principal
- Jefferson Elementary School (472; 1-5 - South)
  - Susie Hung, principal
- McKinley Elementary School (309; 1-5 - South)
  - Mary McCabe, principal
- Tamaques Elementary School (444; 1-5 - South)
  - David Duelks, principal
- Washington Elementary School (289; 1-5 - North)
  - Andrew Perry, principal
- Wilson Elementary School (349; 1-5 - North)
  - Crystal Marsh, principal

Intermediate schools

- Thomas Alva Edison Intermediate School (774; 6-8 - South)
  - LaNova Schall, principal
- Roosevelt Intermediate School (668; 6-8 - North)
  - Brian Gechtman, principal

High school

- Westfield High School (1,784; 9-12)
  - Mary Asfendis, principal

Public school students are also eligible to apply to attend the Union County Vocational Technical Schools, which include Union County Magnet High School, Union County Academy for Information Technology, Union County Academy for Allied Health Sciences, Union County Vocational Technical High School and Union County Academy for Performing Arts.

== Press ==
Westfield High School publishes a weekly student newspaper during the school year called Hi's Eye. Established in 1935, the paper publishes 33 issues per year with a monthly Arts and Entertainment insert called Iris. The Hi's Eye is unique among many student run newspapers in that it is weekly and completely self-funded. The motto for the Hi's Eye is "For the students, by the students, since 1935."

The middle schools and elementary schools also publish a brief newspaper written by their students, for their students. Theodore Roosevelt Intermediate School publishes an issue of The Rough Rider 12 times a year. Thomas Alva Edison Intermediate School publishes The Edison Insider a few times a year. Woodrow Wilson Elementary School publishes an issue of The Wilson World twice a year.

== Administration ==
Core members of the district's administration are:

- Raymond A. González, superintendent
- Patricia Ramos, business administrator and board secretary

== Board of education ==
The district's board of education, composed of nine members, sets policy and oversees the fiscal and educational operation of the district through its administration. As a Type II school district, the board's trustees are elected directly by voters to serve three-year terms of office on a staggered basis, with three seats up for election each year held (since 2012) as part of the November general election. The board appoints a superintendent to oversee the district's day-to-day operations and a business administrator to supervise the business functions of the district.
