= Union County Vocational-Technical High School =

High school in Union County, New Jersey, US

Location
- 1776 Raritan Road; Scotch Plains, Union County, New Jersey 07076; United States
- 40.6167°N 74.3583°W

Information
- Type: public high school
- Established: 2002
- School district: Union County Vocational Technical Schools
- NCES School ID: 341804005738
- Principal: Jeffrey Lerner
- Faculty: 23.8 FTEs
- Grades: 9-12
- Enrollment: 507 (as of 2023–24)
- Student to teacher ratio: 21.3:1
- Accreditation: Middle States Association of Colleges and Schools
- Website: uctech.ucvts.org

The Union County Vocational-Technical High School ("UCTech") is a full-time vocational public high school, located in Scotch Plains in Union County, in the U.S. state of New Jersey. This school serves students in ninth through twelfth grades from across Union county as a career academy on the Union County Vocational Technical Schools Campus, which also includes the Union County Academy for Allied Health Sciences, Academy for Information Technology, Union County Magnet High School and the Academy for Performing Arts. The school is accredited until January 2031 by the Middle States Association of Colleges and Schools Commission on Elementary and Secondary Schools.

As of the 2023–24 school year, the school had an enrollment of 507 students and 23.8 classroom teachers (on an FTE basis), for a student–teacher ratio of 21.3:1. There were 40 students (7.9% of enrollment) eligible for free lunch and 6 (1.2% of students) eligible for reduced-cost lunch.

== Awards, recognition and rankings ==
UCTech was recognized as a National Blue Ribbon School of Excellence by the United States Department of Education in the 2011-12 school year.

In its listing of "America's Best High Schools 2016", the school was ranked 189th out of 500 best high schools in the country; it was ranked 29th among all high schools in New Jersey.

Schooldigger.com ranked the school tied for 18th out of 381 public high schools statewide in its 2011 rankings (a decrease of 6 positions from the 2010 ranking) which were based on the combined percentage of students classified as proficient or above proficient on the mathematics (98.3%) and language arts literacy (100.0%) components of the High School Proficiency Assessment (HSPA).

== Academies ==
UCTech offers six career academies, which are distinguished by small cohorts of students, approximately 25 students per academy class that pursue vocational education within a specific field:

- Academy for Clinical Care Sciences (Clinical)
- Academy of Law & Justice (ALJ)
- Exercise Physiology and Related Sciences (Ex Phys.)
- School of Design (Design)
- School of Sustainable Sciences (Sustainable)
- Teacher Education Academy (TEA)

The School of Design, School of Sustainable Sciences, and Teacher Education Academy spend their 12th grade year at Kean University.
