= Justin Sears =

American basketball player (born 1994)

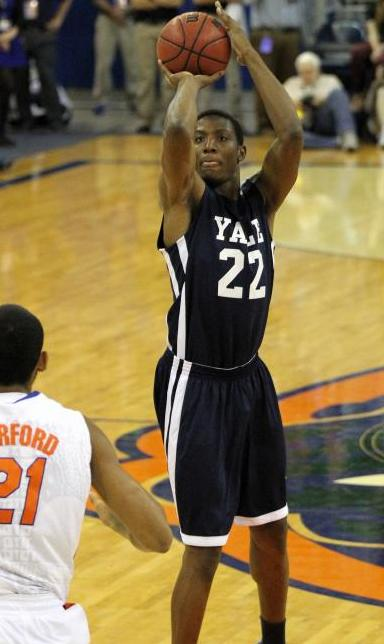
- Sears playing for Yale in 2014

Personal information
- Born: January 3, 1994 (age 32) Plainfield, New Jersey, U.S.
- Listed height: 6 ft 8 in (2.03 m)
- Listed weight: 205 lb (93 kg)

Career information
- High school: Plainfield (Plainfield, New Jersey); Academy for Information Tech (Scotch Plains, New Jersey)
- College: Yale (2012–2016)
- NBA draft: 2016: undrafted
- Playing career: 2016–2021
- Position: Center / power forward

Career history
- 2016–2017: Gießen 46ers
- 2017–2018: MHP Riesen Ludwigsburg
- 2018–2020: EWE Baskets Oldenburg
- 2020–2021: s.Oliver Würzburg

Career highlights
- AP Honorable Mention All-American (2016); 2× Ivy League Player of the Year (2015, 2016); 3× First-team All-Ivy League (2014–2016)

Justin Sears (born January 3, 1994) is a retired American/British basketball player for s.Oliver Würzburg of the Basketball Bundesliga. He played college basketball for the Yale Bulldogs. He was named Ivy League Player of the Year twice, in 2015 and 2016.

== Early life ==
Justin was born to Ryan and Lorna Sears and brought up in Plainfield, New Jersey. He and his younger brother, Jordan, began playing tennis at age four, and his experience with the sport helped his footwork. Jordan started playing basketball in sixth grade, and Justin began playing for fun with the Catholic Youth Organization (CYO) at around the same time. Justin competed at a higher level in eighth grade, after his father's friend encouraged him to play in a league in Plainfield. The Sears brothers later competed for both the basketball and tennis teams at Plainfield High School. Their 7-foot (2-metre) wingspans helped them excel as a doubles tennis team. Even though he played sports for Plainfield, Justin officially attended the Academy for Information Technology in Scotch Plains, New Jersey, who did not have any sports teams. The academy was a branch of Union County Vocational Technical Schools.

== High school career ==
As a basketball player at Plainfield High School, Sears finished with historical numbers of 1,048 points and 1,063 rebounds. He became the second player in school history to record over 1,000 in each category. In his sophomore season, Sears helped Plainfield make a postseason run, and in turn, drew the attention of colleges. As his junior season came to a close, he began receiving offers from NCAA Division I schools. As a senior, Sears averaged 13.4 points, 12.0 rebounds and 3.2 blocks, and he garnered first team all-state, all-area and all-county accolades. During his time with Plainfield, he led his team to two New Jersey State Interscholastic Athletic Association (NJSIAA) Group III titles. He also appeared in the NJSIAA Tournament of Champions championship game two times, losing to St. Anthony High School on both occasions.

== College career ==
On October 29, 2011, Sears committed to play college basketball at Yale University with the Bulldogs. He commented, "Four years ago if you told me I was going to Yale, I would have started laughing at you. But looking at it now, it's a great opportunity that's been given to me." While at Yale, he was named Ivy League Player of the Year twice (2015, 2016). During his senior year he led the Bulldogs to their first NCAA Tournament in 54 years. During the Tournament, he helped lead the Bulldogs to an upset victory over Baylor in the first round before falling to Duke in the second round.

== Professional career ==
Sears signed with Gießen 46ers in June 2016. On July 12, 2017, Sears signed with MHP Riesen Ludwigsburg of the German Basketball Bundesliga for the 2017–18 season. On November 28, 2018 Sears signed with EWE Baskets Oldenburg. He averaged 5.9 points and 3.1 rebounds per game during the 2019–20 season. On July 26, 2020, Sears parted ways with the team.

On August 14, 2020, Sears signed with s.Oliver Würzburg.

== Great Britain national team ==
Sears played for the British national team.

== Personal life ==
Sears attended high school at The Academy For Information Technology in Scotch Plains, New Jersey. With the Plainfield High School basketball team, he was known to read books and do his homework in the locker room. He often prioritized his academics over his athletics, despite receiving offers from several NCAA Division I colleges. While finding a college, Sears tried to find a school that stood out both academically and in its athletics programs, with a professional basketball career being uncertain. In order for Justin to attend Yale University, the Sears family had to pay about $54,000 per year. At Yale, Sears has taken environmental politics and law classes. His major was undeclared, with an interest in economics.
