= Union County Academy for Allied Health Sciences =

Magnet high school in Union County, New Jersey, US

Location
- 1776 Raritan Road; Scotch Plains, Union County, New Jersey, New Jersey 07076; United States; 40.618735°N 74.358361°W

Information
- Type: Public high school
- Established: September 2005
- School district: Union County Vocational Technical Schools
- NCES School ID: 341804000584
- Principal: Kevin Dougherty
- Faculty: 15.7 FTEs
- Grades: 9-12
- Enrollment: 304 (as of 2023–24)
- Student to teacher ratio: 19.3:1
- Colors: Maroon and Gold
- Accreditation: Middle States Association of Colleges and Schools
- Website: aahs.ucvts.org

The Union County Academy for Allied Health Sciences (UCAAHS) is a full-time vocational public high school, located in Scotch Plains, in Union County, in the U.S. state of New Jersey. The school serves students in ninth through twelfth grades from across Union County as a career academy on the Union County Vocational Technical Schools Campus, which also includes the Academy for Information Technology, Union County Magnet High School, Academy for Performing Arts, and the Union County Vocational Technical High School. The school is accredited by the Middle States Association of Colleges and Schools Commission on Elementary and Secondary Schools through July 2028.

The Academy is dedicated to the education of students in health sciences and related fields of study, as part of the Union County Vocational Technical Schools. The school was founded in September 2005.

As of the 2023–24 school year, the school had an enrollment of 304 students and 15.7 classroom teachers (on an FTE basis), for a student–teacher ratio of 19.3:1. There were 19 students (6.3% of enrollment) eligible for free lunch and 6 (2.0% of students) eligible for reduced-cost lunch.

== Awards, recognition and rankings ==
The school was one of nine public schools—and the only public high school—recognized in 2017 as Blue Ribbon Schools by the United States Department of Education.

In its listing of "America's Best High Schools 2016", the school was ranked 21st out of 500 best high schools in the country; it was ranked eighth among all high schools in New Jersey.

The Academy for Allied Health Sciences was ranked as the 21st overall High School in the nation and 2nd ranked High School in New Jersey on the list of "America's Top Schools 2014" prepared by Newsweek magazine. In its 2014 report on "America's Best High Schools", The Daily Beast ranked the school 47th in the nation among participating public high schools and 6th among schools in New Jersey. It was ranked 70th by Newsweek magazine in its 2011 list of America's Best High Schools.

As a public high school in the state of New Jersey, the Academy for Allied Health Sciences complies with state mandated High School Proficiency Assessment (HSPA) testing for its Junior students. Since inception, 100% of students at the Academy for Allied Health Sciences earn passing scores. For the Class of 2010, 49.2% of students received scores of Advanced Proficiency in the Language Arts section, while 79.7% of students received scores of Advanced Proficiency in the Mathematics section. These figures are among the highest in the state. Schooldigger.com ranked the school as one of 16 schools tied for first out of 381 public high schools statewide in its 2011 rankings (unchanged from the 2010 rank) which were based on the combined percentage of students classified as proficient or above proficient on the language arts literacy (100.0%) and mathematics (100.0%) components of the High School Proficiency Assessment (HSPA).

== Application and admission ==
The Union County Academy for Allied Health Sciences is highly selective, application-only school. Applicants must be in high academic standing. As part of the application process, it is mandatory to attend an "Information Session", and then take a two part entrance exam, consisting of English and Math sections. This is the same exam taken by all applicants to a UCVTS school (includes Union County Magnet High School, Academy for Performing Arts, Academy for Information Technology, and the Union County Vocational Technical High School) . Admission is very competitive, with approximately 3-6 students selected each year from every town in Union County.

Admissions is based on a scale of 0-100 the following criteria:

- Grade point average - 7th grade
- Grade point average - 8th grade 1st marking period
- Admissions Assessment for Mathematics
- Admissions Assessment for Language Arts

The process of being accepted is as following

- Attendance at an information session
- Submissions of an application and transcripts to the admissions office
- Admissions examination - Mid January
- Notification of acceptance - On or before April 1

== Curriculum ==
Graduation requirements include:

Mathematics (see below) - 4 years

- Combined Algebra (1 & 2)
- Geometry/Trigonometry
- Math Analysis
- AP Calculus I/AB, AP Calculus II/BC, Multivariable Calculus, Probability and Statistics, AP Statistics

Science - 4 years

- Biology & Scientific Inquiry and Analysis
- Chemistry & Anatomy and Physiology
- Physics, AP Biology, AP Chemistry, Food Science, Forensic Science
- Psychology, Biochemistry, Chemical Engineering, Ecology, AP Chemistry, AP Physics, AP Biology

Language Arts - 4 years

- English I- World Literature
- English II- Early American Literature
- English III- American Literature II
- English IV- AP English or a selection of other available Language Arts courses

Fitness/Health - 4 years

World Language: Spanish (see below) - 3 years

- Spanish I, II, III, IV & AP Spanish

Social Studies - 3 years

- World History I
- US History I
- US History II
- AP United States Government and Politics or a selection of other available Social Studies courses

Visual & Performing Arts - 1 year

- Dance I (Equivalent of Half-year)
- Dance II (Equivalent of Half-year)

The Allied Health Component of UC AAHS includes:

Freshmen:

- Healthcare Organizations & Interprofessional Practice

Sophomores:

- Fundamentals of Health and Wellness & Community Health
- American Red Cross CPR for the Professional Rescuer
- Medical Terminology
- Emergency and Clinical Care

Juniors:

- Anatomy and Physiology I
- American Red Cross First Responder Training

Seniors:

- EMT - Basic Certification from UCC
- Principles of Scientific Inquiry and Analysis/Allied Health Capstone
- Senior Internship

NOTE: Math and World Language courses offer placement tests before the star of freshman year, allowing rising freshmen to skip courses up to Math Analysis and Spanish III, respectively. Students must still complete the required years of study.

== State and college entrance exams ==
With respect to PSAT and SAT scores, students consistently receive National Merit Commendations annually, while SAT score ranges are significantly above state averages. For the Class of 2009, the following average scores were reported. 87% of students in the Class of 2009 had taken the SAT by the time the School Report Card for 2008-2009 was published.

Mathematics: 613 Critical Reading: 592 Writing: 608

== Awards ==
The Academy for Allied Health Sciences has sent students to the HOSA (Health Occupations Students of America) National Leadership Conference. Awards include Gold and Silver medals in Creative Problem Solving, Medical Reading, and a number of other competitions, along with top 10 finishes in a number of other competitions. The school has also produced three National Executive Council members, who have represented over 202,000 HOSA members internationally.

In addition, the Academy for Allied Health Sciences, Magnet High School, and Academy for Performing Arts were named the #1 youth per capita in the nation by the American Cancer Society for their fundraising efforts at their Relay for Life event.

Students at the Academy for Allied Health Sciences have been selected for the Edward J. Bloustein Distinguished Scholar, the New Jersey Governor's School in the Sciences and the New Jersey Governor's School on the Environment, National Achievement Finalists, National Merit Commendations, and the prestigious Gates Millennium Scholarship.
