= Union County Vocational Technical Schools Campus =

Vocational schools in New Jersey, United States

- Interactive map of the Union County Vocational Technical Schools Campus area

General information
- Coordinates: 40°37′03″N 74°21′28″W
- Opened: 1968

Technical details
- Size: 42 acres

The Union County Vocational Technical Schools Campus is a hub for education located in Scotch Plains, New Jersey.

== Buildings on Campus ==
This campus contains:

- Union County Vocational Technical Schools
  - Union County Academy for Performing Arts (UC-APA or APA, located in its own building)
  - Union County Academy for Allied Health Sciences (UC-AAHS or AAHS; housed in Baxel Hall)
  - Union County Academy for Information Technology (UC-AIT or AIT; housed in Bistocchi Hall)
  - Union County Magnet High School (UCMHS; housed in Mancuso Hall)
  - Union County Vocational-Technical High School (UC TECH; housed in West Hall)
  - Union County Academy for Global Logistics (UC-AGL or AGL; housed in the Union County College building)
- Rutgers School of Health Related Professions Scotch Plains Campus
- The John H. Stamler Police Academy

== History ==
Plans to open what would later become the Union County Vocational-Technical Schools Campus were announced in early 1966, as the new home for the Union County Vocational-Technical Institute. A 42-acre site along Raritan Road in Scotch Plains was chosen to construct three buildings, at a cost of $3.75 million. Upon opening in 1968, these buildings housed central services, the adult technical institute, and the high-school aged vocational center. Campus expansions included an allied health studies building in 1973 and an expansion to the Vocational Center in 1980, focusing on special services. After a merger with Union County College in 1982, the focus on adult classes was moved to other UCC locations in the county, leading the technical institute building to be abandoned. Beginning in the mid-1990s, a push was made to open a magnet high school on the campus. $3.5 million was spent gutting and renovating the abandoned technical institute building, which opened as the Union County Magnet High School in September 1997. Since 1997, the campus has seen a number of expansions as more high schools are built and fewer adult classes are offered. The Academy for Information Technology opened on the south side of the campus in the mid-2000s. During the same time period, the central services building was renovated and expanded to house the Academy for Allied Health Sciences. As part of the same construction project, an addition was added to the vocational center to house a new cafeteria, which would replace the one in the central services building. In the late 2000s, the Academy for Performing Arts was built on the northeast corner of the campus. As the 2010s approached, bridges and breezeways were constructed across the campus, making it possible to walk between buildings without going outside. As of 2015, construction is currently underway to partially demolish and expand the vocational center, to house new academic classrooms.
