= Arch of Titus (painting) =

1871 painting by George Peter Alexander Healy, Frederic E. Church, and Jervis McEntee

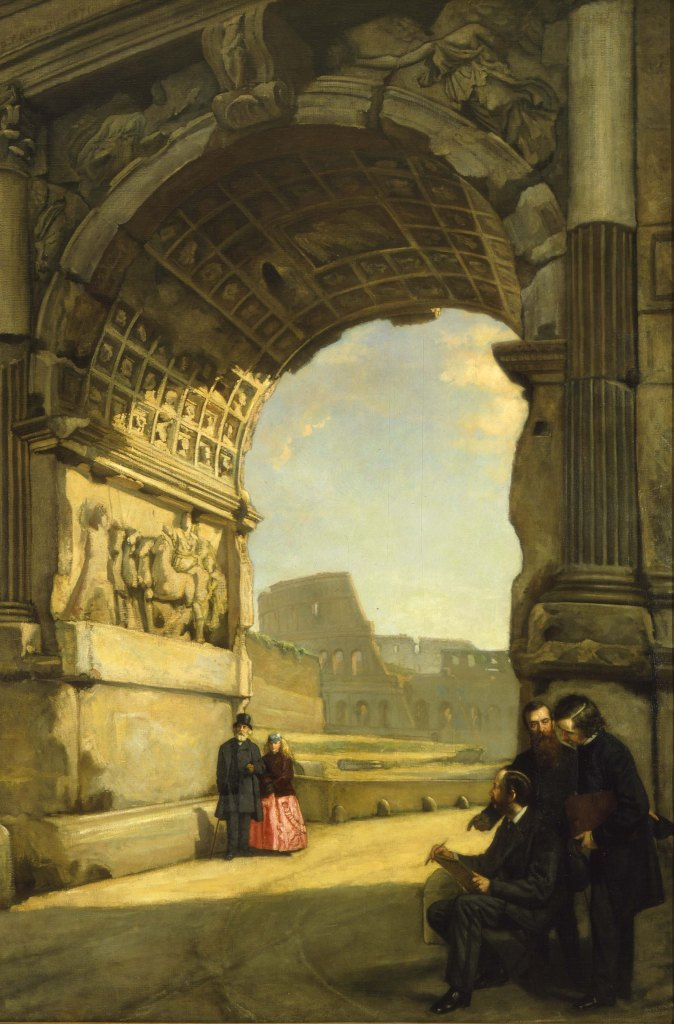
Arch of Titus. Newark Museum. Oil on canvas, 188 by 124.5 centimetres (74.0 in × 49.0 in)

The Arch of Titus is an 1871 oil painting on canvas. It was a collaboration between three American painters: George Peter Alexander Healy, Frederic E. Church, and Jervis McEntee. It depicts the Arch of Titus in Rome, with the Colosseum in the background, and includes portraits of Henry Wadsworth Longfellow and his daughter Edith, and the three artists. The painting is currently on display in the Newark Museum in Newark, New Jersey.

== Description ==
The painting depicts a number of people under the Arch of Titus in Rome, with the Colosseum in the background. The Arch was painted by Church, and the Colosseum by McEntee. Healy, a portraitist, painted five figures in two groups. To the left, under the Arch, are Henry Wadsworth Longfellow with his daughter Edith, copied from a photograph. To the right are the three artists: Church is seated sketching, while Healy looks over his left shoulder, and McEntee stands behind them pointing at the sketch.

On the death in 1926 of Jonathan Ackerman Coles, son of American doctor Abraham Coles, the painting was bequeathed to Newark Museum.

== The artists ==
George Peter Alexander Healy, a portrait artist, was living in Italy during the time that he collaborated on The Arch of Titus. Born in Boston, Massachusetts in 1813, Healy received encouragement from painter Thomas Sully to pursue his artistic career. After opening his own portrait studio at the age of eighteen, Healy realized that he did not have the professional skills necessary in order for him to reach his fullest potential as an artist. Because of this, in 1834, he went to Paris to study with artist Antoine Jean Gros at the École des Beaux-Arts, one of the most influential art schools in France. The school focused on classical styles and on preserving these ideas to be passed on to future generations. After finishing school Healy completed a yearlong tenure under Gros. By the mid-1840s, Healy's reputation had begun to grow and he began painting portrait for prominent figures such as Lewis Cass, the American minister to France and Louis-Phillipe, king of the French. Eventually, Healy gained international recognition and a broad range of clientele. With his wife and seven children, Healy alternated residence between Europe and American. He continued to paint some of the most well known people of his time. One of his commissions included a series or portraits of the American presidents.

In 1866 Healy moved with his family to Rome, and it was during his time there that he collaborated on The Arch of Titus. Healy's contribution to The Arch of Titus was the figures, fittingly as he was a portrait painter. Throughout all his paintings, his sitters are always represented in a pleasant manner and evoked a certain sense of calmness, which is seen true in The Arch of Titus (Fink).

Unlike Healy and many of the other American artists of that time period, Frederic E. Church did not study abroad. He was born in Hartford, Connecticut in 1826, to a well-off family. His father secured him a spot to study under landscape artist Thomas Cole in Catskill, New York. Cole declared Church as "having the finest eye for drawing in the world." After studying under Cole, Church opened his own studio in New York. In New York he established a reputation for his paintings of expansive New York and New England views. His reputation grew to international recognition for his painting Niagara. Church encountered the work of Alexander von Humboldt, a naturalist and explorer, who encouraged artists to travel and paint in South America. Inspired, Church made two trips to Colombia in 1853 and to Ecuador in 1857 respectively. After the loss of his wife and two children, Church traveled to Jamaica to help him deal with his grief. After starting a new family, Church continued traveling visiting Palestine and Jordan, and culminating in a trip to Rome in 1869. It was the memories and sketches from this visit that he drew upon for his part in the collaboration on The Arch of Titus. (Newark Museum)

A student of Church's, Jervis McEntee was born in Rondout, New York in 1828. McEntee traveled through Europe in 1869, the same year the Church visited Rome. Although McEntee did not receive the same fame as Healy or Church, he is most well known for his meticulously kept journals.

== See also ==
- List of paintings by Frederic Edwin Church
