= Arch of Titus =

Ancient Roman arch, a landmark of Rome, Italy

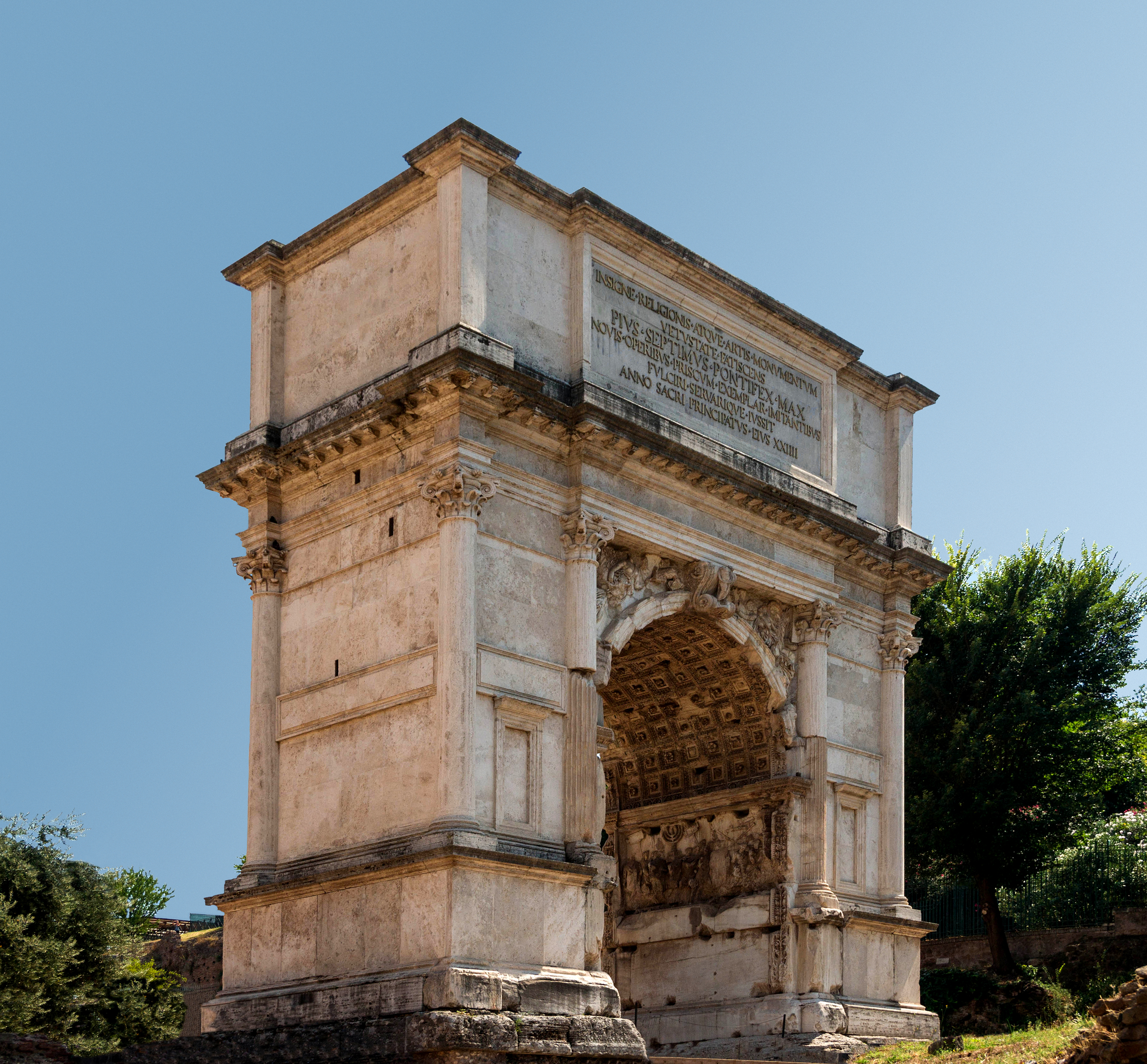
- The Arch of Titus

- Shown within Augustan Rome
- Click on the map for a fullscreen view
- 41°53′26.5812″N 12°29′18.906″E
- Type: honorific arch
- Location: Regio X Palatium

History
- Built: c. 81 AD
- Built by: Emperor Domitian

The Arch of Titus (Italian: Arco di Tito; Latin: Arcus Titī) is a 1st-century AD honorific arch, located on the Via Sacra, Rome, just to the south-east of the Roman Forum. It was constructed in c. 81 AD by Emperor Domitian shortly after the death of his older brother Titus to commemorate Titus's official deification or consecratio and the victory of Titus together with their father, Vespasian, over the Jewish rebellion in Judaea.

The arch contains panels depicting the triumphal procession celebrated in 71 AD after the Roman victory culminating in the fall of Jerusalem, and provides one of the few contemporary depictions of artifacts from Herod's Temple. Although the panels are not explicitly stated as illustrating this event, they closely parallel the narrative of the Roman procession described a decade prior in Josephus's The Jewish War.

It became a symbol of the Jewish diaspora, and the menorah depicted on the arch served as the model for the menorah used as the emblem of the State of Israel.

The arch has provided the general model for many triumphal arches erected since the 16th century. It is the inspiration for the Arc de Triomphe in Paris. It holds an important place in art history, being the focus of Franz Wickhoff's appreciation of Roman art in contrast to the then-prevailing view.

== History ==
Based on the style of sculptural details, Domitian's favored architect Rabirius, sometimes credited with the Colosseum, may have executed the arch. Without contemporary documentation, however, attributions of Roman buildings based on style are considered shaky. The brother and successor of Titus built the arch despite being described as hateful towards Titus by Cassius Dio.

The medieval Latin travel guide Mirabilia Urbis Romae noted the monument, writing: "the arch of the Seven Lamps of Titus and Vespasian; [where Moses' candlestick is having seven branches, with the Ark, at the foot of the Cartulary Tower"].

During the Middle Ages, the Frangipani family added a second story to the vault, converting it into a fortified tower; beam holes from the construction remain in the panels. A chamber was built in the upper half, and the roadway was lowered to expose the travertine foundations.

Pope Paul IV (papacy 1555–9), having established the Roman Ghetto in the bull Cum nimis absurdum, made the arch the place of a yearly oath of submission, forcing Jewish elders to kiss the feet of each newly crowned pope.

In 1716, Adriaan Reland published his De spoliis templi Hierosolymitani in arcu Titiano Romae conspicuis, in English: "The spoils of the temple of Jerusalem visible on the Arch of Titus at Rome".

It was one of the first buildings to undergo a modern restoration, starting with Raffaele Stern in 1817 and continued by Valadier under Pius VII in 1821, with new capitals and with travertine masonry, distinguishable from the original marble. The restoration was a model for the country side of Porta Pia.

At an unknown date, a local ban on Jews walking under the arch was placed on the monument by Rome's Chief Rabbinate; this was rescinded on the foundation of the State of Israel in 1947, and at a Hanukkah event in 1997 the change was made public. The arch was never mentioned in Rabbinic literature.

== Description ==
=== Architecture ===
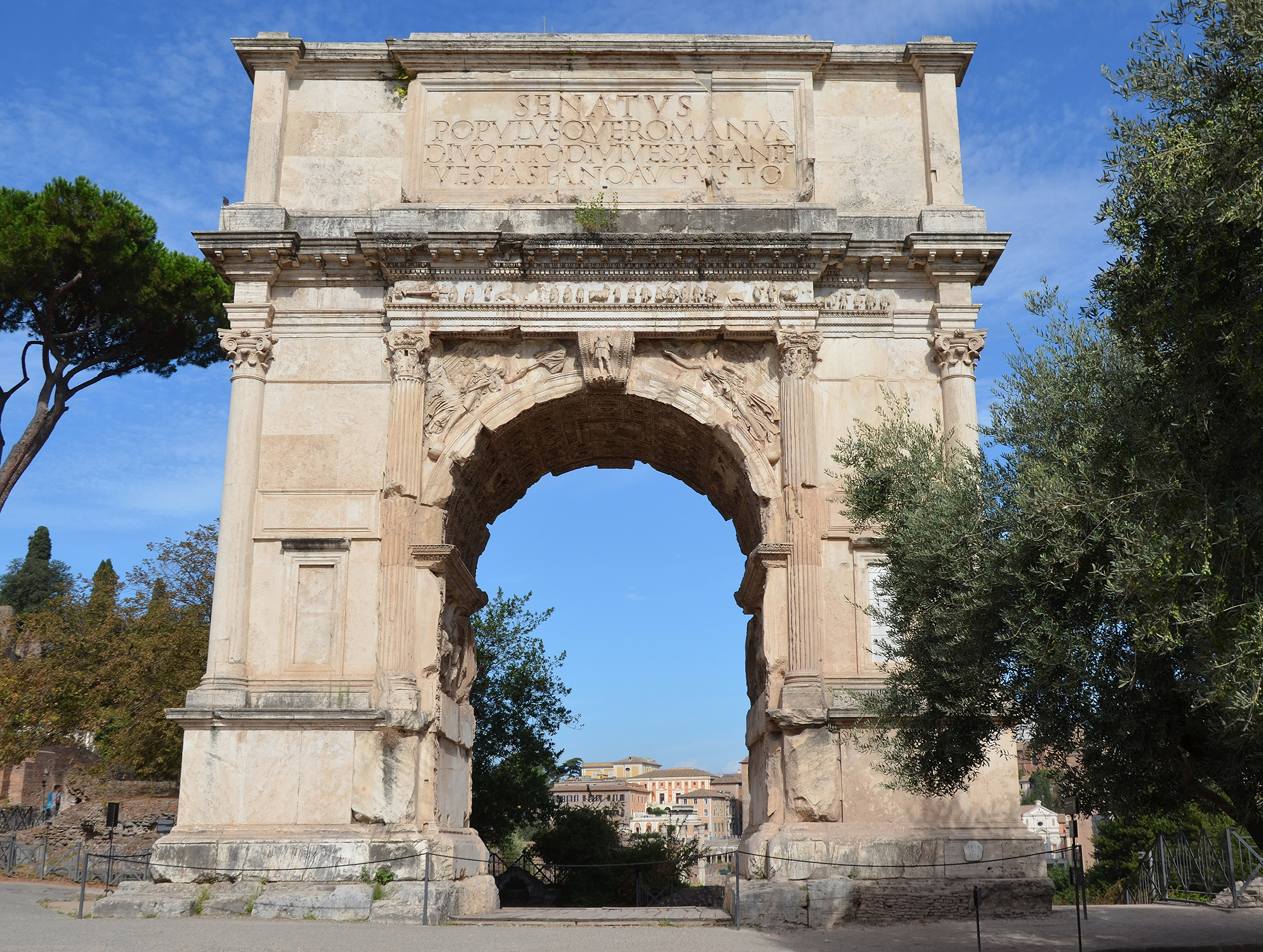
Front view

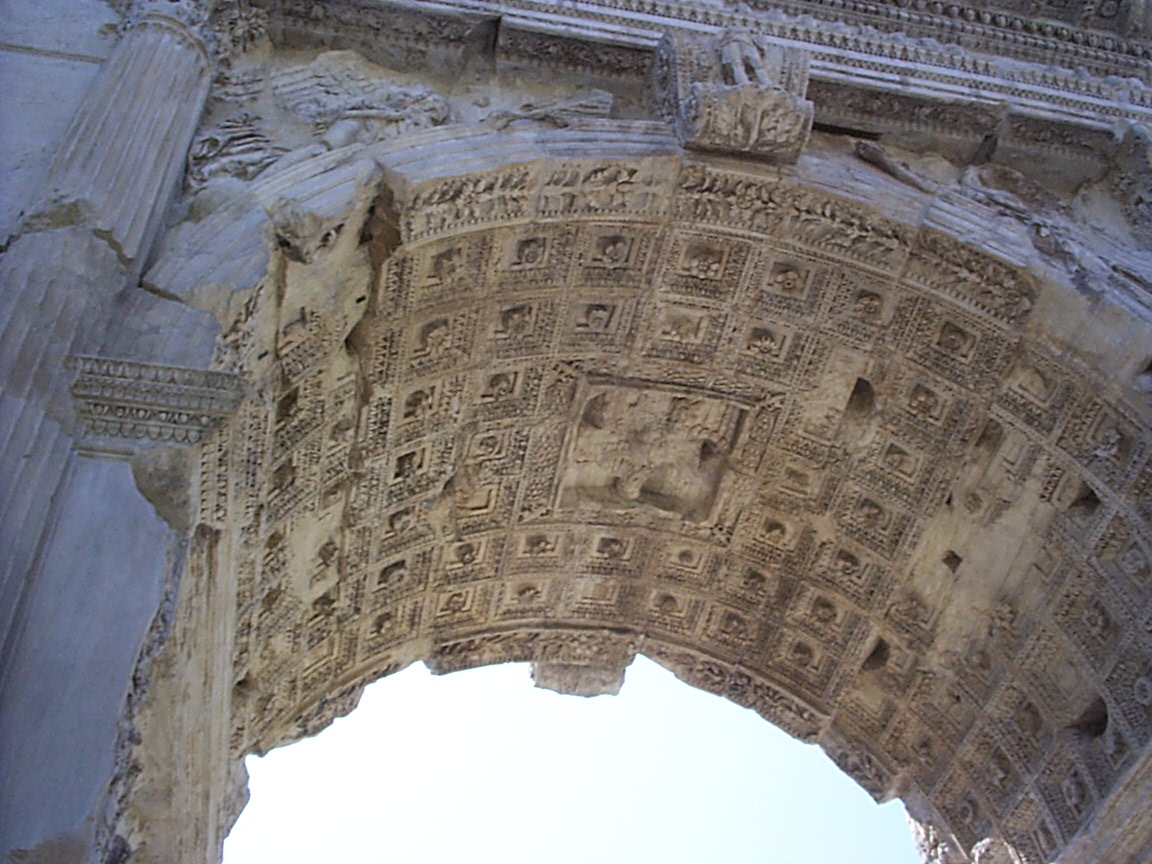
Detail of the central soffit coffers

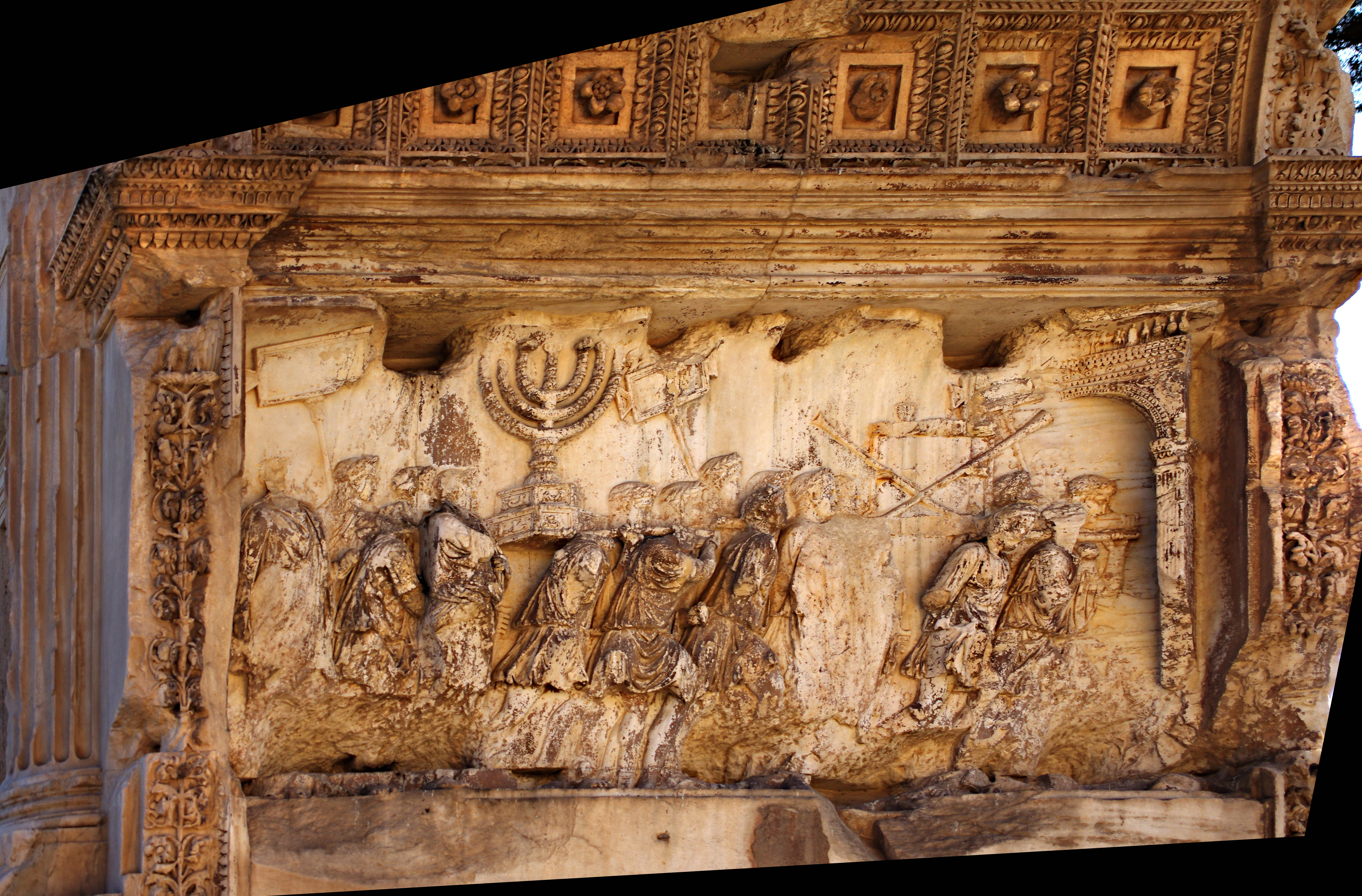
South inner panel, close-up of relief showing spoils from the fall of Jerusalem

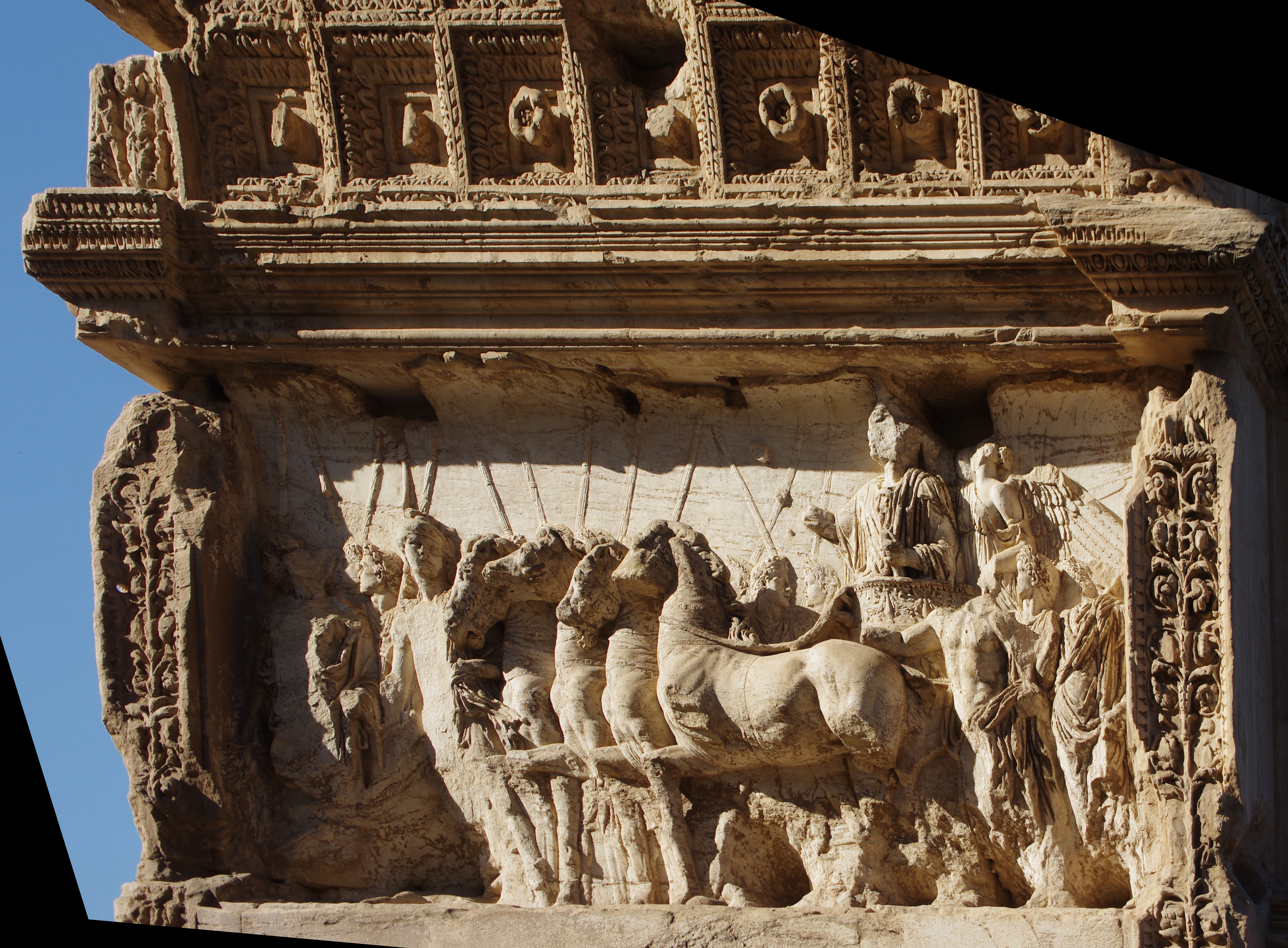
North inner panel, relief of Titus as triumphator

The arch is large, with both fluted and unfluted columns, the latter resulting from 19th-century restoration.

=== Size ===
The Arch of Titus measures: 15.4 meters (50 ft) in height, 13.5 meters (44 ft) in width, 4.75 meters (15.5 ft) in depth. The inner archway is 8.3 meters (27 ft) in height, and 5.36 meters (17.5 ft) in width.

=== Decorative sculpture ===
The spandrels on the upper left and right of the arch depict personifications of victory as winged women. Between the spandrels is the keystone, on which there stands a female on the east side and a male on the west side.

The soffit of the axial archway is deeply coffered with a relief of the apotheosis of Titus at the center. The sculptural program also includes two panel reliefs lining the passageway within the arch. Both commemorate the joint triumph celebrated by Titus and his father Vespasian in mid-71.

The south inner panel depicts the spoils taken from the Temple in Jerusalem. The golden candelabrum or Menorah is the main focus and is carved in deep relief. Other sacred objects being carried in the triumphal procession are the Gold Trumpets, the fire pans for removing the ashes from the altar, and the Table of Showbread. These spoils were likely originally colored gold, with a blue background. In 2012 the Arch of Titus Digital Restoration Project discovered remains of yellow ochre paint on the menorah relief.

The north inner panel depicts Titus as triumphator attended by various genii and lictors, who carry fasces. A helmeted Amazonian, Valour, leads the quadriga, a four-horse chariot carrying Titus. Winged Victory crowns him with a laurel wreath. The juxtaposition is significant in that it is one of the first examples of divinities and humans being present in one scene together. This contrasts with the panels of the Ara Pacis, where humans and divinities are separated.

The sculpture of the outer faces of the two great piers was lost when the Arch of Titus was incorporated into medieval defensive walls. The attic of the arch was originally crowned by more statuary, perhaps of a gilded chariot. The main inscription used to be ornamented with letters made of perhaps silver, gold, or another metal.

=== Inscriptions ===
==== Original inscription ====
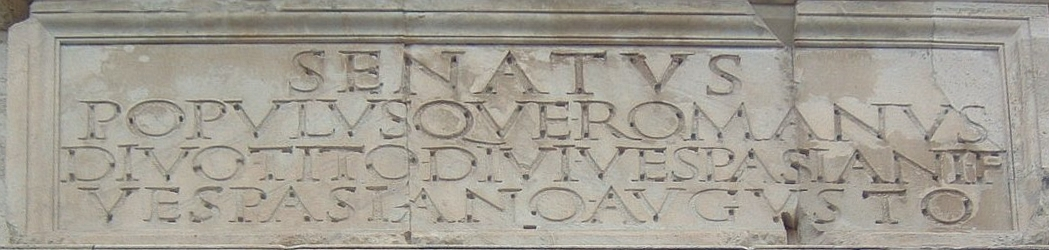
The inscription

The original inscription is attached to the east side of the Arch. It is written in Roman square capitals and reads:

SENATVS

POPVLVSQVE⸱ROMANVS
DIVO⸱TITO⸱DIVI⸱VESPASIANI⸱F[ILIO]

VESPASIANO⸱AVGVSTO

(Senatus Populusque Romanus divo Tito divi Vespasiani filio Vespasiano Augusto), which means

The Senate and the Roman people (dedicate this) to the deified Titus Vespasian Augustus, son of the deified Vespasian."

==== 1821 inscription ====
The opposite side of the Arch of Titus received new inscriptions after its restoration during the pontificate of Pope Pius VII by Giuseppe Valadier in 1821. The restoration was intentionally carried out in travertine to distinguish the original from the restored portions.

The inscription reads:

INSIGNE⸱RELIGIONIS⸱ATQVE⸱ARTIS⸱MONVMENTVM

VETVSTATE⸱FATISCENS
PIVS⸱SEPTIMVS⸱PONTIFEX⸱MAX[IMVS]
NOVIS⸱OPERIBVS⸱PRISCVM⸱EXEMPLAR⸱IMITANTIBVS
FVLCIRI⸱SERVARIQVE⸱IVSSIT

ANNO⸱SACRI⸱PRINCIPATVS⸱EIVS⸱XXIIII

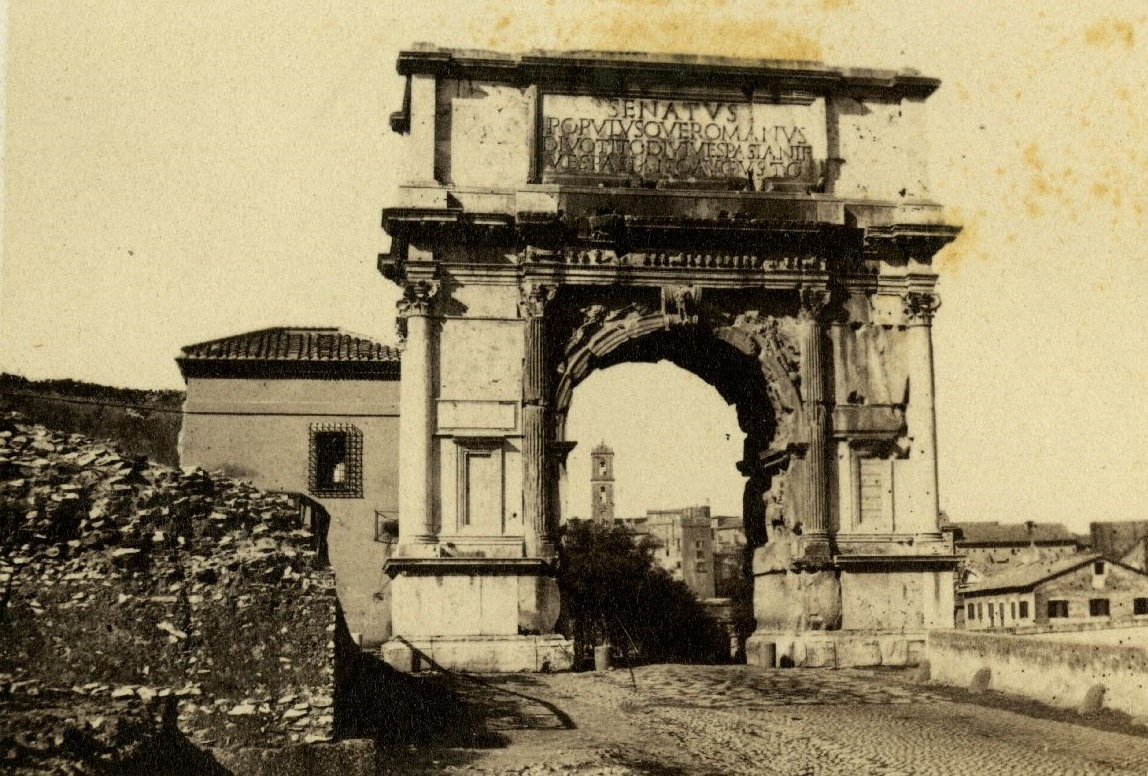
Arch of Titus, photographed around 1880.

(Insigne religionis atque artis, monumentum, vetustate fatiscens: Pius Septimus, Pontifex Maximus, novis operibus priscum exemplar imitantibus fulciri servarique iussit. Anno sacri principatus eius XXIV), which means

(This) monument, remarkable in terms of both religion and art,
had weakened from age:
Pius the Seventh, Supreme Pontiff,
by new works on the model of the ancient exemplar
ordered it reinforced and preserved.

• In the 24th year of his sacred rulership. •

== Architectural influence ==
Works modelled on, or inspired by, the Arch of Titus include:

- façade of the Basilica di Sant'Andrea di Mantova by Leon Battista Alberti (1462)
- Arc de Triomphe (Paris, 1806)
- Soldiers' and Sailors' Arch (Brooklyn, 1892)
- Washington Square Arch by Stanford White (Manhattan, 1892)
- the temporary Dewey Arch (Manhattan, 1899)
- Fusiliers' Arch (Dublin, 1907)
- National Memorial Arch in Valley Forge National Historical Park by Paul Philippe Cret (Pennsylvania, 1910)
- India Gate by Edwin Lutyens (New Delhi, 1921)

== Gallery ==
The Arch in Art
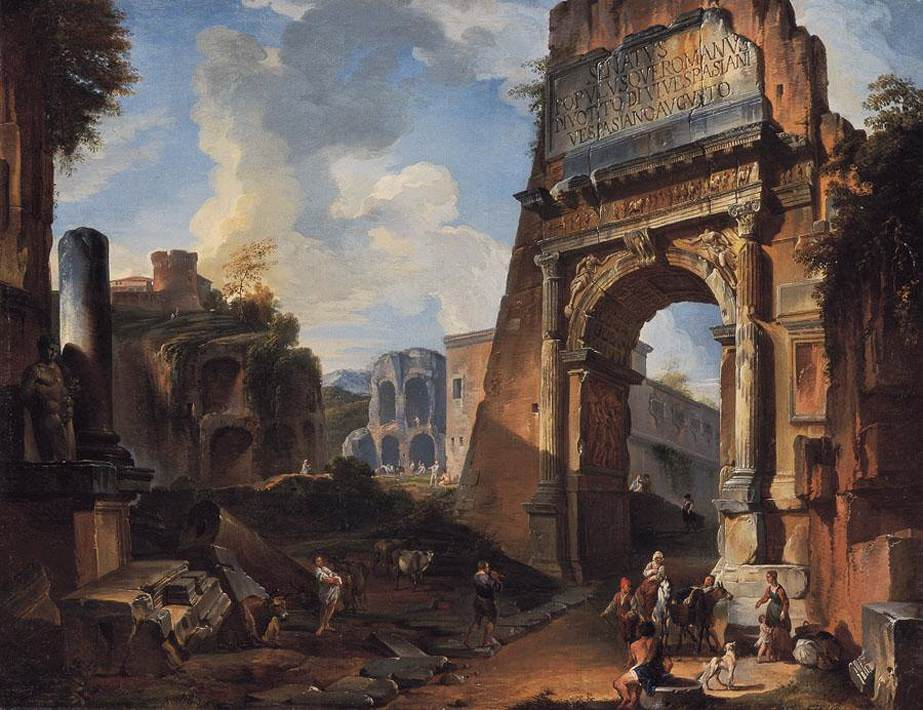
c.1740 by Giovanni Paolo Panini

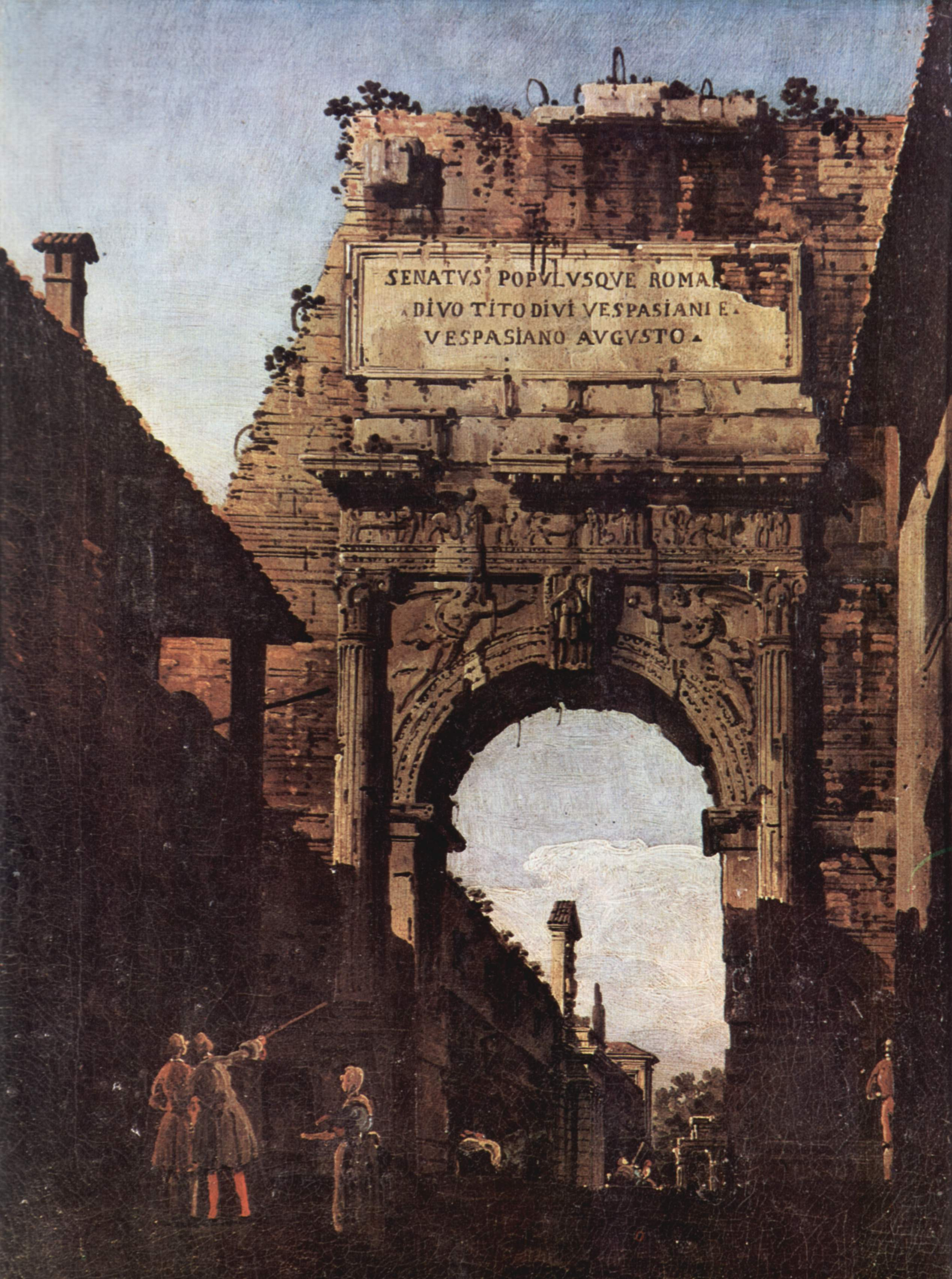
1744 by Canaletto

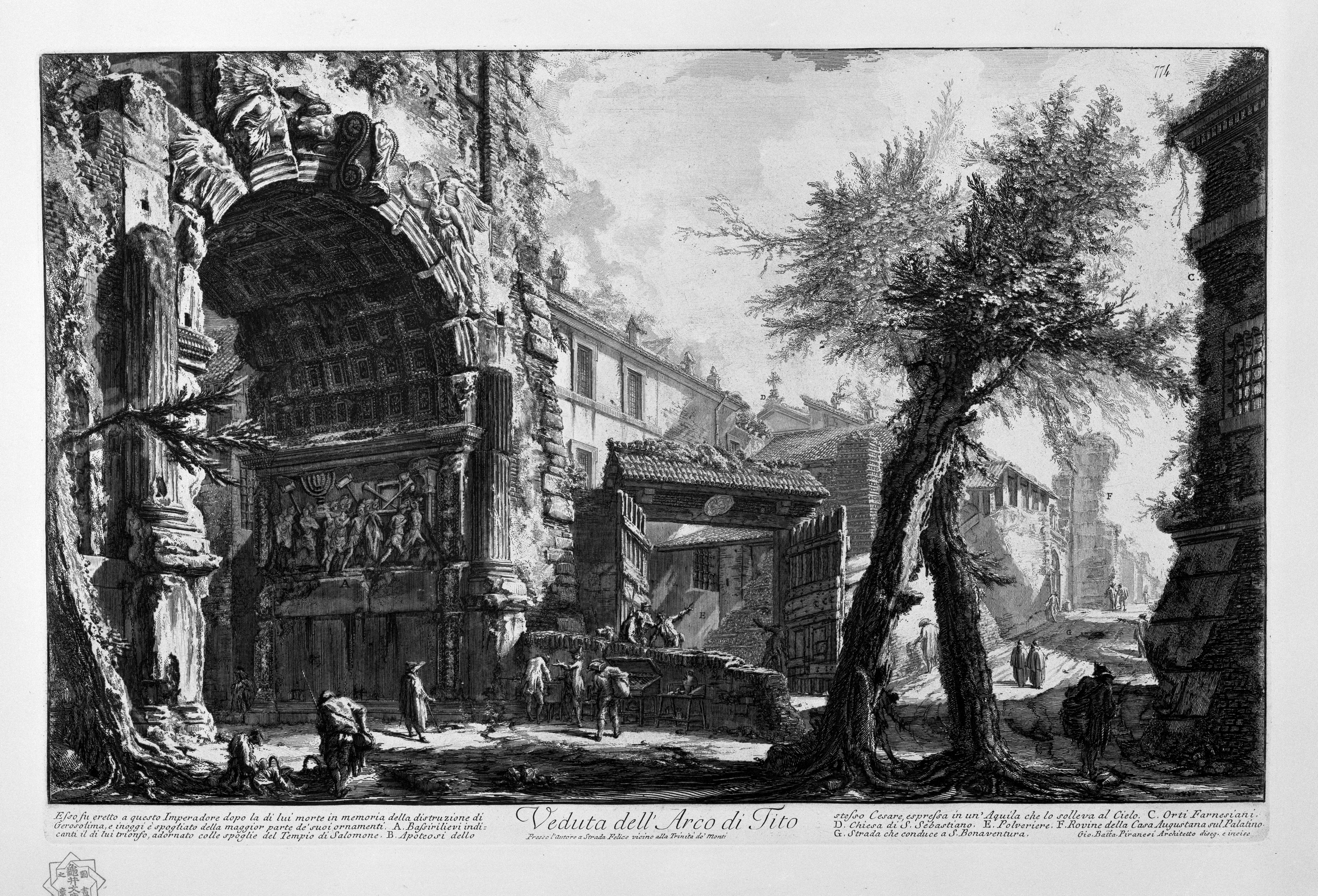
1748–74 by Giovanni Battista Piranesi

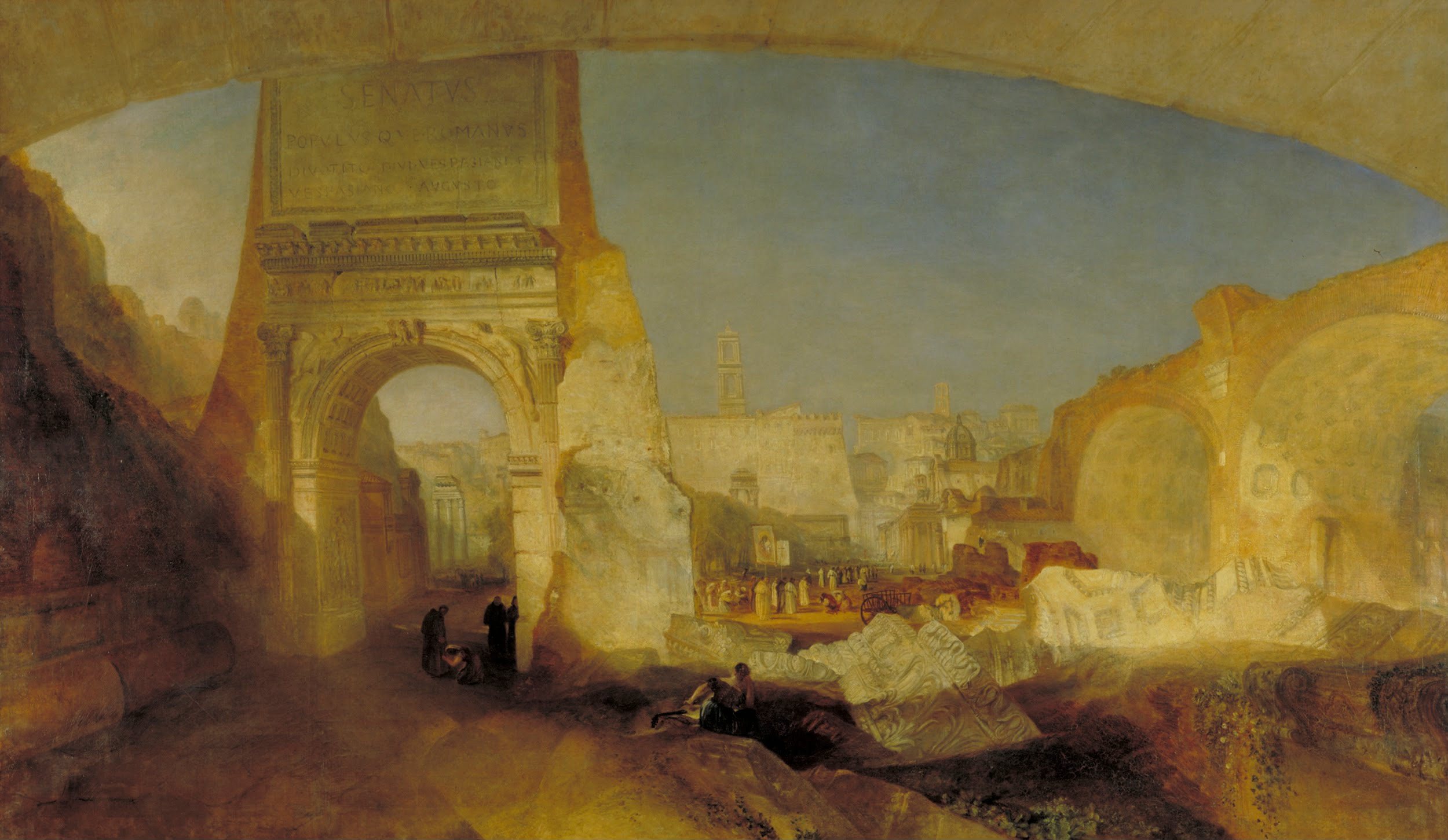
1826, Forum Romanum by J. M. W. Turner

1839 by Constantin Hansen

== See also ==
External videos
- Smarthistory - Arch of Titus

- Arch of Constantine – 4th-century triumphal arch in Rome, Italy

Related to the Jewish revolt

- Judaea Capta coinage
- Menorah (Temple)
- Showbread

Related to Roman triumph and the Arch

- Ancient Roman architecture
- Arch of Titus painting
- List of Roman triumphal arches
- Roman triumph

Preceded by Arch of Septimius Severus	Landmarks of Rome; Arch of Titus	Succeeded by Arcus Novus
