= Plainfield Township, New Jersey =

Coordinates: 40.634°N 74.378°W

Historical population
Census	Pop.	Note	%±
1850	2,447		—
1860	3,224		31.8%
Population sources: 1850-1860 1850 1870

Plainfield Township was a township in New Jersey, United States, that existed from 1847 until it was dissolved in 1878.

The township was established by an Act of the New Jersey Legislature on April 5, 1847, from portions of Westfield Township, while the area was still part of Essex County. On March 19, 1857, it became part of the newly created Union County. Plainfield city was incorporated as a city on April 21, 1869, from portions of Plainfield Township, based on the results of a referendum held that same day. The city and township coexisted until March 6, 1878, when Plainfield Township was dissolved and parts were absorbed by Plainfield city, with the remainder becoming Fanwood Township (now known as Scotch Plains).
