= Abraham Coles =

American physician and poet

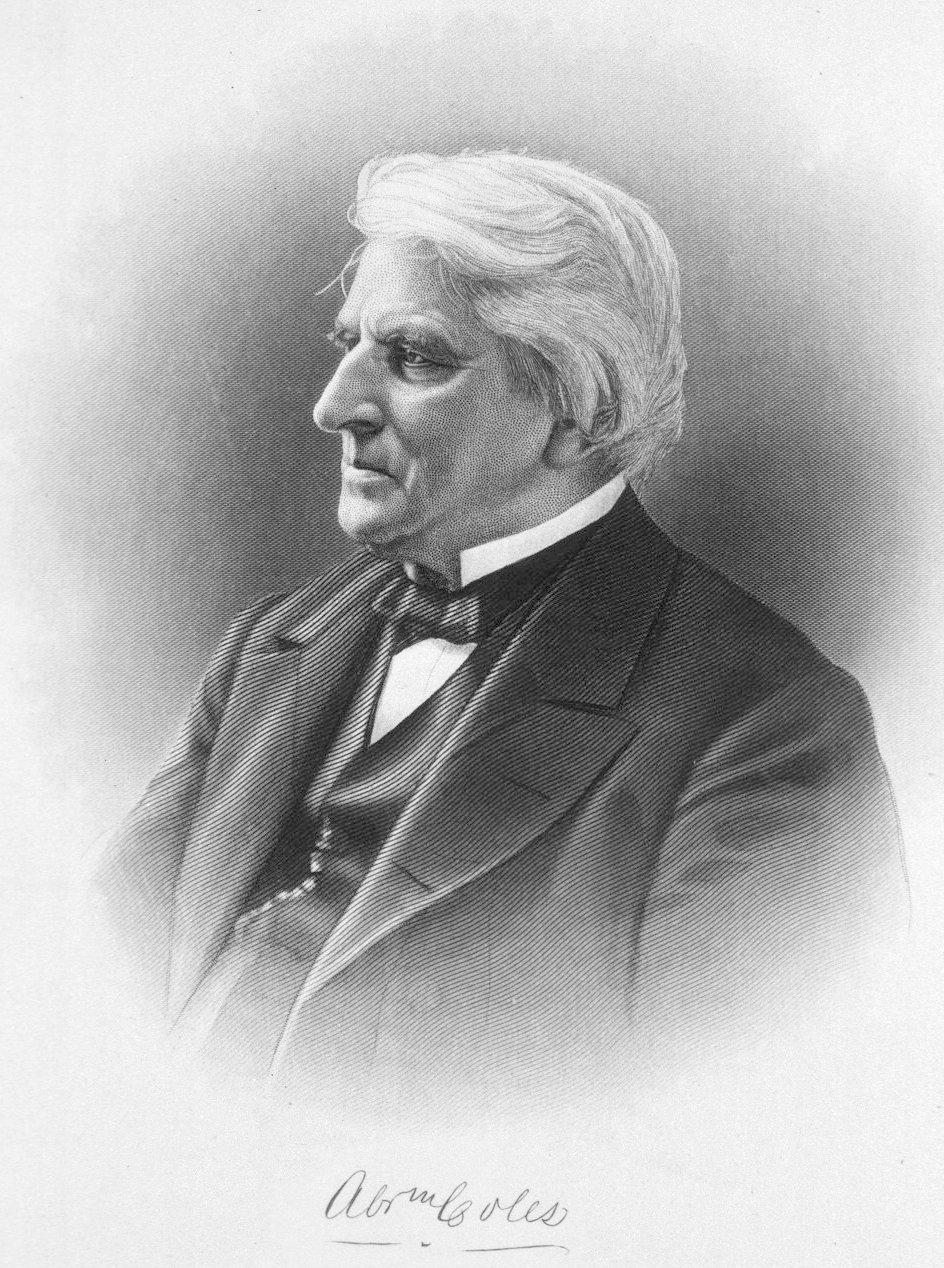
- Born: December 26, 1813; Scotch Plains, New Jersey
- Died: May 3, 1891 (aged 77); Hotel Del Monte, Monterey, California
- Medical career
- Sub-specialties: Physician

Abraham Coles (December 26, 1813 – May 3, 1891) was an American physician, translator, author and poet from New Jersey. He published Dies Irae (1859), Stabat Mater Dolorosa (1865), Stabat Mater Speciosa (1866), Old Gems in New Settings (1866), The Microcosm (1866, 1881), The Evangel in Verse (1874) and The Light of the World (1884).
