= Union County Vocational Technical Schools =

School district in Union County, New Jersey, US

Address
- 1776 Raritan Road Scotch Plains, Union County, New Jersey, 07076; United States
- Coordinates: 40.618771°N 74.358213°W

District information
- Grades: Vocational
- Superintendent: Gwendolyn Ryan
- Business administrator: Janet Behrmann
- Schools: 8

Students and staff
- Enrollment: 1,668 (as of 2022–23)
- Faculty: 137.0 FTEs
- Student–teacher ratio: 12.2:1

Other information
- District Factor Group: NA
- Website: www.ucvts.org
Ind.	Per pupil	District spending	Rank (*)	Vocational average	%± vs. average
1A	Total Spending	$18,031	6	$18,891	−4.6%
1	Budgetary Cost	11,723	2	17,296	−32.2%
2	Classroom Instruction	7,125	4	9,045	−21.2%
6	Support Services	694	1	2,269	−69.4%
8	Administrative Cost	1,509	4	2,353	−35.9%
10	Operations & Maintenance	2,107	4	3,014	−30.1%
13	Extracurricular Activities	132	4	464	−71.6%
16	Median Teacher Salary	59,501	7	65,035
Data from NJDoE 2014 Taxpayers' Guide to Education Spending. *Of Vocational districts with any number of students. Lowest spending=1; Highest=21

The Union County Vocational-Technical Schools (UCVTS) are a grouping of schools on the Union County Vocational Technical Schools Campus in Scotch Plains, in the U.S. state of New Jersey, which offers educational programs for students across Union County, eight at the high school level for students in ninth through twelfth grades and one at the adult education level. The high school level programs are separated into two groups, full-time students and shared-time students; and the full-time programs are further subdivided into the vocational program and career academies.

As of the 2022–23 school year, the district, comprised of eight schools, had an enrollment of 1,668 students and 137.0 classroom teachers (on an FTE basis), for a student–teacher ratio of 12.2:1.

In 2023, The Union County Vocational-Technical Schools (UCVTS) in Scotch Plains received a $33-million investment to enhance and expand facilities on their Raritan Road campus. Announced by NJ Senate President Nick Scutari and Union County officials on July 26, the funding aimed to improve educational offerings at UCVTS.

== Awards and recognition ==
Union County Magnet High School was recognized in 2003 by Governor Jim McGreevey as one of 25 schools selected statewide for the First Annual Governor's School of Excellence award.

In 2016, the Academy for Performing Arts was one of ten schools in New Jersey, and one of two high school programs in the state, recognized as a National Blue Ribbon School by the United States Department of Education. The Academy for Allied Health Sciences was one of nine public schools—and the only public high school—recognized in 2017 as Blue Ribbon Schools by the U.S. Department of Education.

In 2021, the Academy for Information Technology (AIT) was given the Blue Ribbon School award by the U.S. Department of Education.

== High school level programs ==
Full-time UCVTS programs

Schools in the district (with 2022–23 enrollment data from the National Center for Education Statistics) are:

Full-time Career and technical academies

- Union County Academy for Allied Health Sciences (AAHS) with 303 students in grades 9–12
  - Kevin Dougherty, principal
- Academy for Global Logistics for grades 9–12
  - Jasmin Lee, principal
- Union County Academy for Information Technology (AIT) with 297 students in grades 9–12
  - Paul DeFrancesco, principal
- Union County Academy for Performing Arts (APA) with 231 students in grades 9–12
  - Kelly Douglas-Jackson, principal
- Union County Magnet High School (MHS) with 303 students in grades 9–12
  - Alice Mansfield-Smith, principal
- Union County Vocational-Technical High School (UCTECH) with 511 students in grades 9–12
  - Jeffrey Lerner, principal

Shared-time / Alternative UCVTS programs

- Raymond J. Lesniak Experience Strength & Hope Recovery High School with 2 students in grades 9–12
- Simon Youth Academy with 23 students in grades 9–12
  - Syreeta McClain, principal
- Union County Career and Technical Institute with 17 students in grades 9–12
  - Lisa Tauscher, principal

== Administration ==
Core members of the district's administration are:

- Gwendolyn Ryan, superintendent
- Janet Behrmann, business administrator and board secretary

== Athletics ==
An intramural program is provided for after school physical activity. For official sports recognized by the NJSIAA, students participate on their home high schools' teams.

Example: A student from Rahway looking to play inter-scholastic sports would play them for Rahway High School.

== Campus newspaper ==
The Campus Chronicle is the monthly newspaper for the UCVTS campus. It is based in the Academy for Information Technology building. While it is called a newspaper, it more closely resembles a magazine in that it is made using duplex A4 paper stapled with three staples on the right binding. The staff use Adobe InDesign as its layout program.

The original name for The Campus Chronicle was TechToday. It was changed due to the addition of the Academy for Performing Arts school on campus, rendering the name TechToday unfitting for the campus newspaper.

=== History ===
TechToday was founded in 2006–2007 school year. During its first year it released three issues, typically around four pages long. Each edition consisted of a news section and an arts section (called TechToday Arts).

2007-2008 TechToday Logo

At the end of the 2006/2007 school year, management was failing and most of the work was being done by the advisor at the time. He appointed two new editors, Phyllis Lee and Taylor Kelly, to take over the next year.

At the 2007-2008 club fair, TechToday had approximately 150 people sign up to join the club. Throughout the year, it had six issues released. It went through a layout program change, from Microsoft Publisher to Apple Pages. It also went under a layout design change, which was well received across campus.

At the 2008-2009 club fair, TechToday had 119 people sign up to join the club. It is planning on switching from Apple Pages to Adobe InDesign as its layout program.

On September 16, 2008, TechToday changed its name to UC Juice. Because the name 'TechToday' did not fit the addition of the Academy for Performing Arts to the UCVTS campus, the name was decided to be changed. The other possible choices were: 'UCVTS Utopian', 'The Ubiquitarian', 'UC Inquirer', 'UCVTS United', and 'UC Juice', and were voted on. UC Juice won by a landslide. The name UC Juice was originated from the nickname of one of the freshman members, Juice.

In 2010, the paper changed its name once again, becoming The Campus Inquirer. It was then once again switched to its current name, The Campus Chronicle.

== Board of education ==
The district's board of education is composed of five members—the county superintendent of schools and four appointed members—who set policy and oversee the fiscal and educational operation of the district through its administration. As a Type I school district, the board's trustees are appointed by the members of the Union County Board of County Commissioners to serve four-year terms of office on a staggered basis, with one seat up for reappointment each year. The board appoints a superintendent to oversee the district's day-to-day operations and a business administrator to supervise the business functions of the district.
