= Academy for Performing Arts =

High school in Union County, New Jersey, US

Location
- 1776 Raritan Road; Scotch Plains, Union County, New Jersey 07076; United States; 40.6170°N 74.3595°W

Information
- Type: Magnet public high school
- Established: 2008
- School district: Union County Vocational Technical Schools
- NCES School ID: 341804003009
- Principal: Kelly Douglas-Jackson
- Faculty: 15.1 FTEs
- Grades: 9-12
- Enrollment: 242 (as of 2024–25)
- Student to teacher ratio: 16.1:1
- Colors: Black, White, Silver
- Accreditation: Middle States Association of Colleges and Schools
- Website: apa.ucvts.org

The Union County Academy for Performing Arts is a full-time four-year public magnet high school located in Scotch Plains, in Union County, in the U.S. state of New Jersey, on the Union County Vocational Technical Schools Campus. Its first year was the 2008–2009 school year. The academy offers majors in theatre, dance, and technical theatre and is part of the Union County Vocational Technical Schools (UCVTS). The school has been accredited by the Middle States Association of Colleges and Schools Commission on Elementary and Secondary Schools since 2017.

As of the 2024–25 school year, the school had an enrollment of 242 students and 15.1 classroom teachers (on an FTE basis), for a student–teacher ratio of 16.1:1. There were 11 students (4.5% of enrollment) eligible for free lunch and 1 (0.4% of students) eligible for reduced-cost lunch.

== Recognition and rankings ==
In 2016, the Academy for Performing Arts was one of ten schools in New Jersey and one of two high school programs in the state to be recognized as a National Blue Ribbon School by the United States Department of Education.

In its 2013 report on “America's Best High Schools,” The Daily Beast ranked the school 962nd in the nation among participating public high schools and 71st among schools in New Jersey. In Newsweek's listing of “America's Best High Schools 2016,” the school was ranked 203rd out of 500 best high schools in the country; it was ranked 32nd among all high schools in New Jersey.

== Partnership with Kean University ==
The students are on the Union County Vocational Technical Schools Campus for the first three years of high school; their senior year is spent at Kean University. While attending Kean, students take college-level classes along with their first-year performing arts curriculum classes.
