= Scotch Plains, New Jersey =

Township in Union County, New Jersey, US

- Township
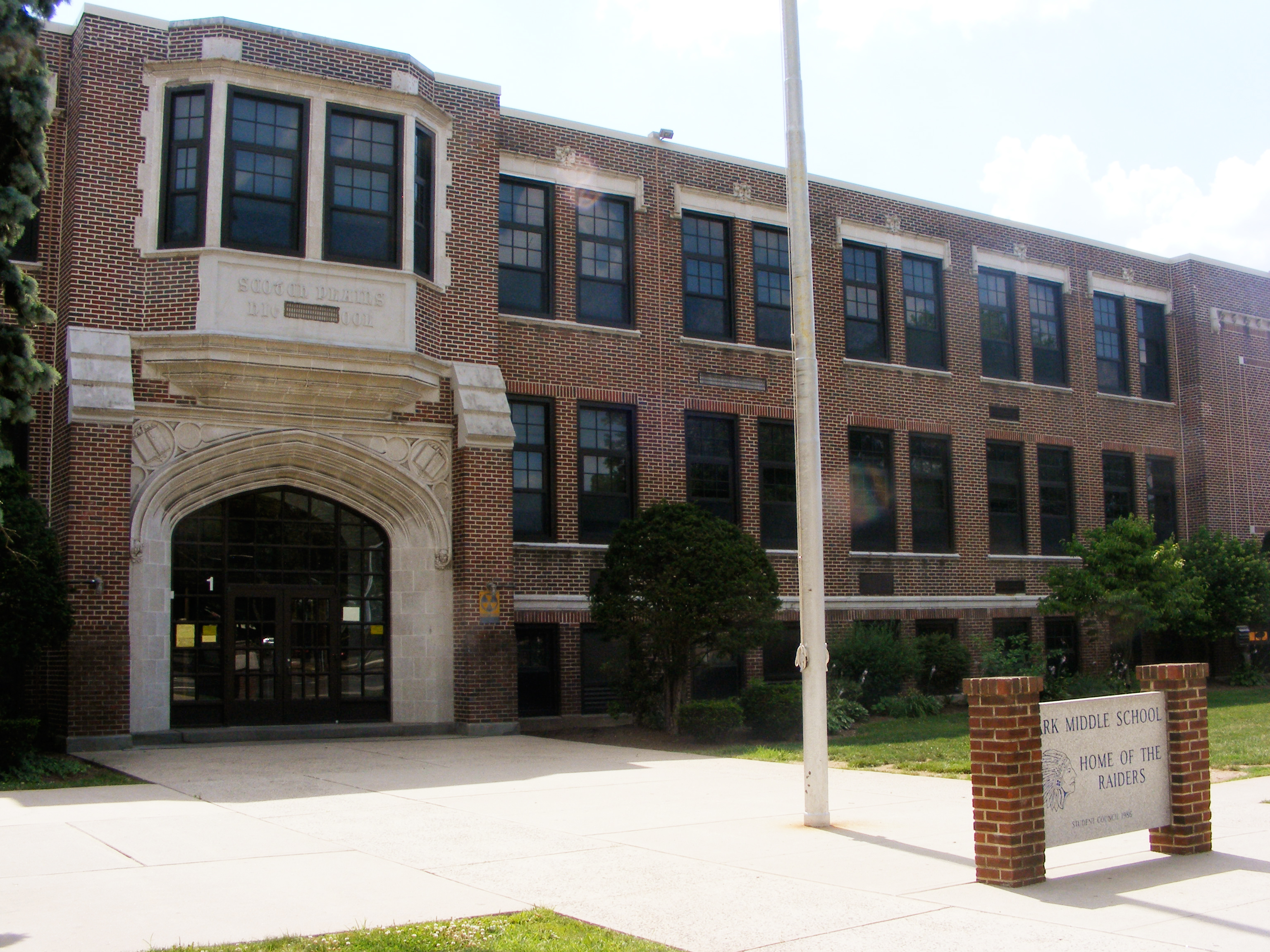
- Malcom E. Nettingham Middle School, constructed in the 1920s as Scotch Plains High School, later becoming Park Middle School, was renamed to honor Nettingham, a Tuskegee Airman and an alumnus of the school.

- Flag Seal

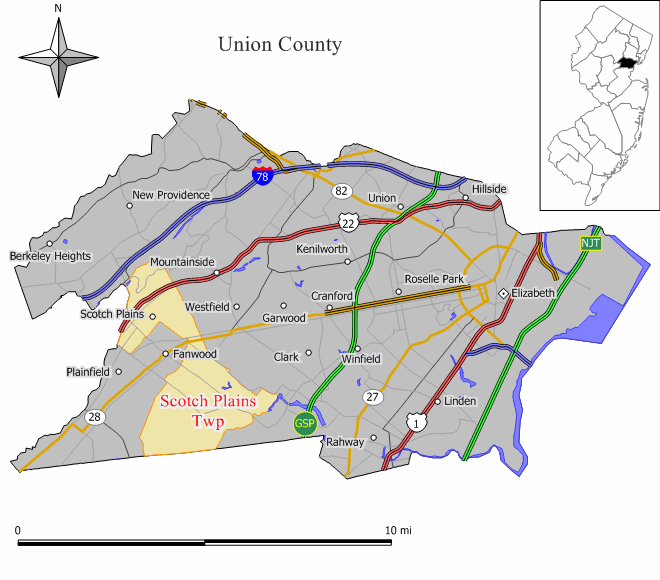
- Map of Scotch Plains Township in Union County. Inset: Location of Union County highlighted in the State of New Jersey.

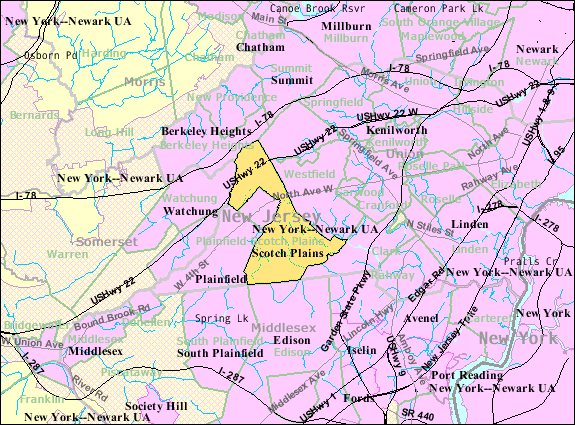
- Census Bureau map of Scotch Plains, New Jersey

- Location in Union County Location in New Jersey Location in the United States
- Coordinates: 40.633029°N 74.372899°W
- Country: United States
- State: New Jersey
- County: Union
- Incorporated: March 6, 1878 (as Fanwood Township)
- Renamed: March 29, 1917 (as Scotch Plains)

Government
  - Type: Faulkner Act (council–manager)
  - Body: Township Council
  - Mayor: Joshua Losardo (D, term ends in 2028)
  - Manager: Alexander Mirabella
  - Municipal clerk: Bozena Lacina

Area
  - Total: 9.06 sq mi (23.46 km^{2})
  - Land: 9.02 sq mi (23.36 km^{2})
  - Water: 0.035 sq mi (0.09 km^{2}) 0.40%
  - Rank: 220th of 565 in state 4th of 21 in county
- Elevation: 141 ft (43 m)

Population (2020)
  - Total: 24,968
  - Estimate (2023): 24,430
  - Rank: 105th of 565 in state 7th of 21 in county
  - Density: 2,767.8/sq mi (1,068.7/km^{2})
  - Rank: 232nd of 565 in state 19th of 21 in county
- Time zone: UTC−05:00 (Eastern (EST))
  - Summer (DST): UTC−04:00 (Eastern (EDT))
- ZIP Code: 07076
- Area code: 908
- FIPS code: 3403966060
- GNIS feature ID: 0882217
- Website: www.scotchplainsnj.gov

Scotch Plains is a township in Union County, in the U.S. state of New Jersey. The township is located on a ridge in northern-central New Jersey, within the Raritan Valley and Rahway Valley regions in the New York metropolitan area. As of the 2020 United States census, the township's population was 24,968, an increase of 1,458 (+6.2%) from the 2010 census count of 23,510, which in turn reflected an increase of 778 (+3.4%) from the 22,732 counted in the 2000 census.

== History ==
=== Native settlement ===
The Lenape are the ancestral community indigenous to a large chunk of the Mid-Atlantic region, stretching from Eastern Pennsylvania to the Atlantic Ocean, and from Delaware to Southern New York. Scotch Plains and the Mid-Atlantic region was used by the Lenape and their ancestors for roughly 10,000 years. It is suggested that the Lenape used Scotch Plains as a temporary camp in between the highly-utilized Delaware River and mountains to the West, and the Atlantic Ocean to the East.

=== Chronology and Ways of life ===
From the earliest periods of the Paleo-Indian (10,000-12,000 years ago) to the Archaic Period (4,000-10,000 years ago), there is evidence suggesting a high degree of mobile hunting in the rivers and woods around the Scotch Plains area, with spears, atlatls, and axe heads being found. During the Woodland period (450-4,000 years ago), it was common for communities to make items such as dugout canoes and nets for fishing, two artifacts the Lenape have come to be known for, along with their shelter of choice, the wigwam. During this time they also extensively farmed, moving around to different areas in search of productive land as the seasons progressed.

=== Colonial era ===
The area known as Scotch Plains was first settled by Europeans, including many Scottish Quakers, as early as 1684. The name is said to have come from George Scott, a leader of a group of Scottish settlers. It later served as a stop on the stage coach line between New York City and Philadelphia.

The Lenni Lenape were significantly impacted by the establishment of colonies in the 17th century, with colonists taking up a large majority of land that had once been the living area of the community. In 1778, the US ratified the first treaty with an American Indian tribe, the Treaty of Fort Pitt; the treaty eventually fell apart, causing the inter-cultural relationship to rupture. Today, the Lenni-Lenape, now known as the Delaware Nation, are found in small regions across the US and Canada. A variety of treaties, conflicts, and migration have spread out the community, although a small group continue to live in their ancestral region, hoping to educate and bring to light their claims to the land, including Scotch Plains.

The Ash Swamp in Scotch Plains was the scene of a key action in the Battle of Short Hills, on June 26, 1777, which included skirmishes as Washington's forces moved along Rahway Road in Scotch Plains toward the Watchung Mountains. The Frazee House in Scotch Plains recalls those skirmishes and, with the acreage adjoining the house, presents a snapshot of the 1770s. This was the home of Aunt Betty Frazee, whose retort to Lord Cornwallis led the British to find their bread from friendlier bakers in the same battle. The farmstead of Betty and Gershom Frazee is being restored by local organizations.

What is now Scotch Plains was originally incorporated as Fanwood Township on March 6, 1878, by an act of the New Jersey Legislature from portions of Plainfield Township and Westfield Township. Portions of the township were taken to form Fanwood Borough on October 2, 1895. Fanwood Township was renamed as Scotch Plains on March 29, 1917, based on the results of a referendum held that same day.

Scotch Plains was home to the Shady Rest Golf and Country Club, the nation's first African-American country club. Its pro, John Shippen, the first African-American golf professional, led the 1892 U.S. Open in the final round before finishing fifth. The Shady Rest clubhouse hosted Cab Calloway and other greats as a local center for African-American culture in the 1920s and 1930s. It is preserved today as the Scotch Hills Municipal course.

A much more complete history of the township can be found in the October 28, 1999, "Our Towns: Scotch Plains-Fanwood (2nd Annual)" issue of The Times of Scotch Plains-Fanwood, produced by the town's newspaper of record at the time as well as on the township's website.

The ancestors of many residents immigrated from the area of Montazzoli, Italy, as part of a wave of Italian immigrants who arrived in the area in the early 20th century. In recognition of this longstanding connection, the township established "Montazzoli Plaza" in October 2015 in front of the Italian American Club.

== Geography ==
According to the United States Census Bureau, the township had a total area of 9.06 square miles (23.46 km^{2}), including 9.02 square miles (23.36 km^{2}) of land and 0.04 square miles (0.09 km^{2}) of water (0.40%).

The township borders the municipalities of Berkeley Heights, Clark, Fanwood, Mountainside, Plainfield and Westfield in Union County; Edison and South Plainfield in Middlesex County; and Watchung in Somerset County.

Unincorporated communities, localities and place names located partially or completely within the township include Alton, Goodmans, Graceland, Two Bridges and Willow Grove.

The Robinson's Branch of the Rahway River additionally flows through Scotch Plains en route to the Robinson's Branch Reservoir.

== Demographics ==
Historical population
Census	Pop.	Note	%±
1880	1,167		—
1890	1,305		11.8%
1900	1,200	*	−8.0%
1910	1,616		34.7%
1920	2,343		45.0%
1930	4,186		78.7%
1940	4,993		19.3%
1950	9,069		81.6%
1960	18,491		103.9%
1970	22,279		20.5%
1980	20,774		−6.8%
1990	21,160		1.9%
2000	22,732		7.4%
2010	23,510		3.4%
2020	24,968		6.2%
2023 (est.)	24,430		−2.2%
Population sources: 1880–1920 1880–1890; 1890–1910 1910–1930; 1940–2000 2000; 2010 2020 * = Lost territory in previous decade.

Bloomberg Businessweek ranked Scotch Plains as the most affordable suburb in New Jersey in its 2009 report.

=== 2020 census ===
Scotch Plains township, Union County, New Jersey – Racial and ethnic composition Note: the US Census treats Hispanic/Latino as an ethnic category. This table excludes Latinos from the racial categories and assigns them to a separate category. Hispanics/Latinos may be of any race.
Race / Ethnicity (NH = Non-Hispanic)	Pop 2000	Pop 2010	Pop 2020	% 2000	% 2010	% 2020
White alone (NH)	17,335	17,121	16,297	76.26%	72.82%	65.27%
Black or African American alone (NH)	2,532	2,519	2,365	11.14%	10.71%	9.47%
Native American or Alaska Native alone (NH)	16	23	14	0.07%	0.10%	0.06%
Asian alone (NH)	1,638	1,795	2,610	7.21%	7.64%	10.45%
Native Hawaiian or Pacific Islander alone (NH)	2	2	0	0.01%	0.01%	0.00%
Other race alone (NH)	30	60	145	0.13%	0.26%	0.58%
Mixed race or Multiracial (NH)	284	408	958	1.25%	1.74%	3.84%
Hispanic or Latino (any race)	895	1,852	2,579	3.94%	6.73%	10.33%
Total	22,732	23,510	24,968	100.00%	100.00%	100.00%

=== 2010 census ===
The 2010 United States census counted 23,510 people, 8,595 households, and 6,429 families in the township. The population density was 2,606.9 per square mile (1,006.5/km^{2}). There were 8,896 housing units at an average density of 986.4 per square mile (380.9/km^{2}). The racial makeup was 77.43% (18,203) White, 11.08% (2,605) Black or African American, 0.12% (29) Native American, 7.65% (1,799) Asian, 0.01% (2) Pacific Islander, 1.39% (327) from other races, and 2.32% (545) from two or more races. Hispanic or Latino of any race were 6.73% (1,582) of the population.

Of the 8,595 households, 37.4% had children under the age of 18; 62.6% were married couples living together; 9.2% had a female householder with no husband present and 25.2% were non-families. Of all households, 21.7% were made up of individuals and 10.0% had someone living alone who was 65 years of age or older. The average household size was 2.72 and the average family size was 3.20.

25.9% of the population were under the age of 18, 5.7% from 18 to 24, 24.9% from 25 to 44, 29.3% from 45 to 64, and 14.2% who were 65 years of age or older. The median age was 40.9 years. For every 100 females, the population had 91.5 males. For every 100 females ages 18 and older there were 88.3 males.

The Census Bureau's 2006–2010 American Community Survey showed that (in 2010 inflation-adjusted dollars) median household income was $104,873 (with a margin of error of +/− $6,397) and the median family income was $126,138 (+/− $7,410). Males had a median income of $90,016 (+/− $11,033) versus $66,022 (+/− $5,055) for females. The per capita income for the borough was $52,488 (+/− $3,094). About 1.3% of families and 3.0% of the population were below the poverty line, including 2.7% of those under age 18 and 4.7% of those age 65 or over.

=== 2000 census ===
As of the 2000 United States census there were 22,732 people, 8,349 households, and 6,295 families residing in the township . The population density was 2,503.3 inhabitants per square mile (966.5/km^{2}). There were 8,479 housing units at an average density of 933.7 per square mile (360.5/km^{2}). The racial makeup of the township was 78.88% White, 11.30% African American, 0.09% Native American, 7.25% Asian, 0.01% Pacific Islander, 0.95% from other races, and 1.52% from two or more races. 3.94% of the population were Hispanic or Latino of any race.

There were 8,349 households, out of which 36.2% had children under the age of 18 living with them, 64.4% were married couples living together, 8.4% had a female householder with no husband present, and 24.6% were non-families. 20.8% of all households were made up of individuals, and 9.3% had someone living alone who was 65 years of age or older. The average household size was 2.71 and the average family size was 3.16.

In the township the population was distributed with 25.4% under the age of 18, 4.7% from 18 to 24, 31.8% from 25 to 44, 24.0% from 45 to 64, and 14.1% who were 65 years of age or older. The median age was 39 years. For every 100 females, there were 92.0 males. For every 100 females age 18 and over, there were 88.8 males.

The median income for a household in the township was $81,599, and the median income for a family was $96,238. Males had a median income of $63,648 versus $43,714 for females. The per capita income for the township was $39,913. 3.0% of the population and 2.0% of families were below the poverty line. Out of the total population, 2.0% of those under the age of 18 and 7.0% of those 65 and older were living below the poverty line.

== Parks and recreation ==
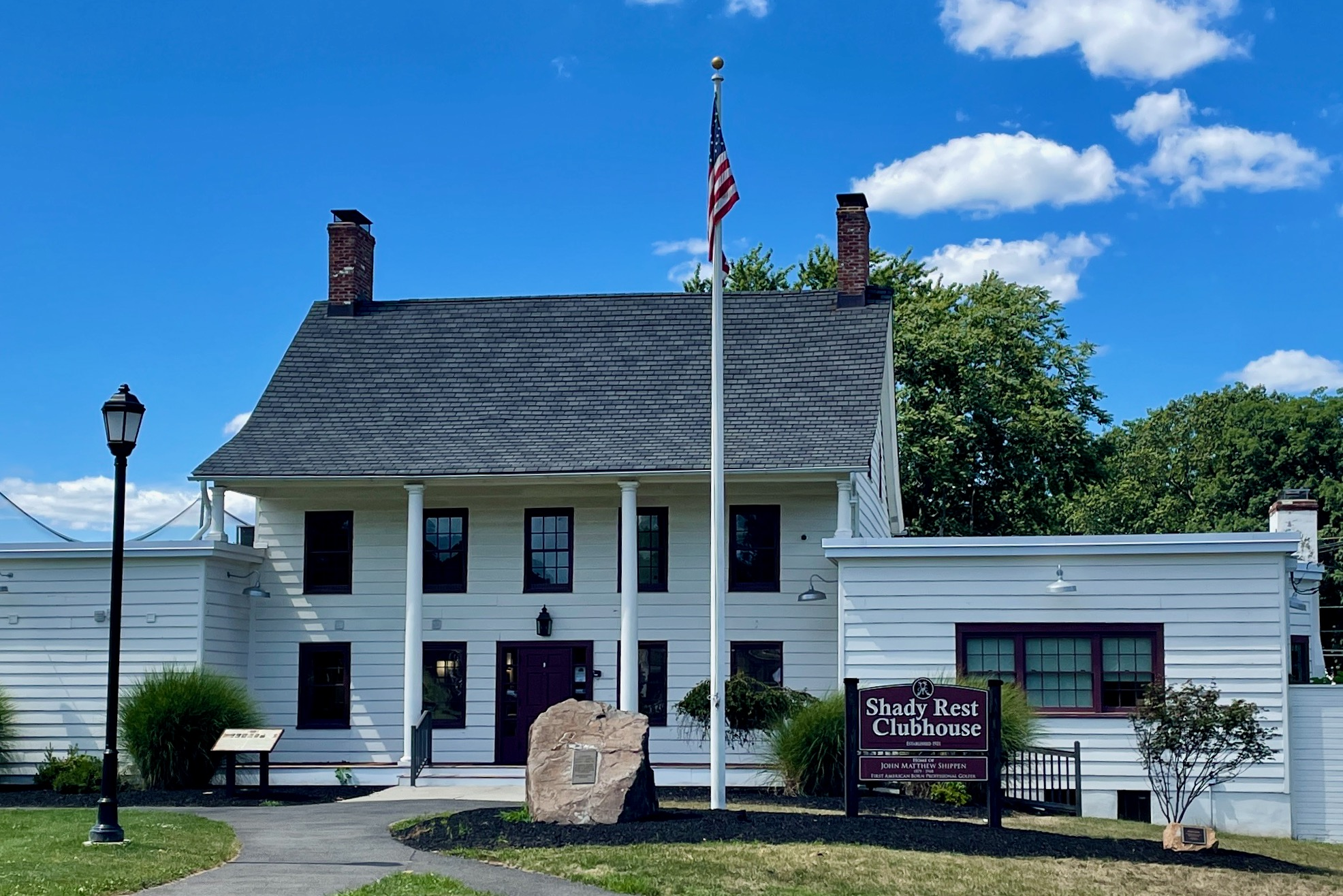
Shady Rest Clubhouse, listed on the NRHP

Parks in the township include:

- Watchung Reservation is a 1,945-acre (787 ha) nature reserve on the north side of the township that includes open space, playgrounds, nature trails, a nature and science center, gardens, stables, and many other amenities.
- Scotch Hills Municipal Golf Course, known as the Shady Rest Golf and Country Club before it was taken over by the township, was at one time the only African-American country club in the United States.
- Ponderosa Farm Park is a park on Cooper Road. Modest park featuring playgrounds and a sprinkler area, plus open green spaces and restrooms.
- Ashbrook Golf Course is a public golf course with 18-holes of championship golf as well as a 9-hole pitch and putt course located on Raritan Road.
- Shackamaxon Country Club is a private golf course, swimming and tennis facility also hosting celebrations, founded in 1916 and is located on Shackamaxon Drive in Scotch Plains. Some of its 130+ acres occupy land in Westfield.
- Willow Grove Swim Club is private swimming club with a 6-lane pool and basketball, pickleball, ping-pong, volleyball, a children's play structure, and a picnic areas. It was established in 1958.
- Bowcraft Amusement Park was an amusement park located on Route 22 West that was featured in scenes in the films Mortal Thoughts (1991) and North (1994). It officially closed in 2018.

== Government ==
=== Local government ===
Scotch Plains is governed within the Faulkner Act, formally known as the Optional Municipal Charter Law, under the Council-Manager form of New Jersey municipal government. The township is one of 42 municipalities (of the 564) statewide that use this form of government. The governing body is comprised of the Mayor and the four-member Township Council. Council members are elected at-large in partisan elections to serve four-year terms of office on a staggered basis in even-numbered years, with the Mayor and one of the council members elected in years divisible by four and the three other council seats coming up for election two years later. The Mayor and the Councilmembers are the only elected officials in the township government. The Mayor and Council then appoint a Township Manager, who serves as the chief executive officer of the Township, with the authority to appoint most subordinate personnel.

As of 2026, the mayor of Scotch Plains is Democrat Joshua G. Losardo, whose term of office expires in 2028. Members of the Township Council are Deputy Mayor Matthew S. Adams (D, 2026), Elizabeth Stamler (D, 2026), Roshan "Roc" White (D, 2026), and Ellen Zimmerman (D, 2028).

In January 2021, the Township Council chose Suman Dahiya-Shah from a list of three candidates nominated by the Democratic municipal committee to fill the council seat expiring in December 2022 that had been held by Joshua Losardo until he stepped down to take office as mayor. In April 2021, Matthew Adams was selected to fill Dahiya-Shah's seat, after she stepped down from office in March, citing "personal reasons". Adams served on an interim basis until the November 2021 general election, when he was elected to serve the balance of the term of office.

The Chief of Police is Jeffrey Briel. The Deputy Police Chief is Al Sellinger.

=== Federal, state and county representation ===
Scotch Plains is split between the 7th and 12th Congressional Districts and is part of New Jersey's 22nd state legislative district.

Prior to the 2010 Census, all of Scotch Plains had been part of the 7th Congressional District, a change made by the New Jersey Redistricting Commission that took effect in January 2013, based on the results of the November 2012 general elections. The redistricting plan that went into effect in 2013 put 1,091 residents from the extreme northernmost portion of the township into the 7th District, with the remaining 22,419 put into the 12th District.

For the 119th United States Congress, New Jersey's 12th congressional district is represented by Bonnie Watson Coleman (D, Ewing Township). For the 119th United States Congress, New Jersey's 7th congressional district is represented by Thomas Kean Jr. (R, Westfield). New Jersey is represented in the United States Senate by Democrats Cory Booker (Newark, term ends 2027) and Andy Kim (Moorestown, term ends 2031).

For the 2026–2027 session, the 22nd legislative district of the New Jersey Legislature is represented in the State Senate by Nicholas Scutari (D, Linden) and in the General Assembly by Linda S. Carter (D, Plainfield) and James J. Kennedy (D, Rahway).

Union County is governed by a Board of County Commissioners, whose nine members are elected at-large to three-year terms of office on a staggered basis with three seats coming up for election each year, with an appointed County Manager overseeing the day-to-day operations of the county. At an annual reorganization meeting held in the beginning of January, the board selects a Chair and Vice Chair from among its members. As of 2026, Union County's County Commissioners are:

Vice Chair Rebecca Williams (D, Plainfield, 2028), Chairman Joesph Bodek (D, Linden, 2026), James E. Baker Jr. (D, Rahway, 2027), Michele Delisfort (D, Union Township, 2026), Lourdes M. Leon (D, Elizabeth, 2026), Alexander Mirabella (D, Fanwood, 2027) Kimberly Palmieri-Mouded (D, Westfield, 2027). Stanley J. Neron (D, Elizabeth, 2028), Joseph Signorello III (D, Roselle Park, 2028)

Constitutional officers elected on a countywide basis are: Clerk Vacant - Incumbent Clerk Joanne Rajoppi (D, Union Township) died on July 16, 2026. Her death triggered a special election for a full five-year term to be held concurrently with the November 2026 general election. Deputy Clerk Clara Fernández assumes the powers of the office until the vacancy is filled. Sheriff Peter Corvelli (D, Kenilworth, 2026) and Surrogate Christopher E. Hudak (D, Clark, 2027).

=== Politics ===
As of March 2011, there were a total of 15,979 registered voters in Scotch Plains Township, of which 5,061 (31.7% vs. 41.8% countywide) were registered as Democrats, 3,562 (22.3% vs. 15.3%) were registered as Republicans and 7,346 (46.0% vs. 42.9%) were registered as Unaffiliated. There were 10 voters registered as Libertarians or Greens. Among the township's 2010 Census population, 68.0% (vs. 53.3% in Union County) were registered to vote, including 91.7% of those ages 18 and over (vs. 70.6% countywide).

United States presidential election results for Scotch Plains
Year	Republican		Democratic		Third party(ies)	
Year	No.	%	No.	%	No.	%
2024	5,403	36.79%	9,031	61.50%	251	1.71%
2020	5,219	34.50%	9,726	64.30%	181	1.20%
2016	4,889	37.32%	7,717	58.91%	494	3.77%
2012	5,394	43.75%	6,801	55.16%	135	1.09%
2008	5,603	43.75%	7,094	55.40%	109	0.85%
2004	5,757	48.08%	6,134	51.23%	83	0.69%

In the 2012 presidential election, Democrat Barack Obama received 6,801 votes (54.8% vs. 66.0% countywide), ahead of Republican Mitt Romney with 5,394 votes (43.5% vs. 32.3%) and other candidates with 135 votes (1.1% vs. 0.8%), among the 12,407 ballots cast by the township's 16,820 registered voters, for a turnout of 73.8% (vs. 68.8% in Union County). In the 2008 presidential election, Democrat Barack Obama received 7,094 votes (55.0% vs. 63.1% countywide), ahead of Republican John McCain with 5,603 votes (43.5% vs. 35.2%) and other candidates with 109 votes (0.8% vs. 0.9%), among the 12,894 ballots cast by the township's 16,359 registered voters, for a turnout of 78.8% (vs. 74.7% in Union County). In the 2004 presidential election, Democrat John Kerry received 6,134 votes (51.0% vs. 58.3% countywide), ahead of Republican George W. Bush with 5,757 votes (47.9% vs. 40.3%) and other candidates with 83 votes (0.7% vs. 0.7%), among the 12,018 ballots cast by the township's 15,361 registered voters, for a turnout of 78.2% (vs. 72.3% in the whole county).

Gubernatorial election results for Scotch Plains
Year	Republican		Democratic		Third party(ies)	
Year	No.	%	No.	%	No.	%
2025	4,242	35.68%	7,607	63.98%	41	0.34%
2021	3,775	40.57%	5,469	58.77%	62	0.67%
2017	2,902	39.24%	4,331	58.57%	162	2.19%
2013	4,504	60.76%	2,804	37.83%	105	1.42%
2009	4,381	51.17%	3,480	40.64%	701	8.19%
2005	3,702	46.94%	3,929	49.82%	255	3.23%

In the 2017 gubernatorial election, Democrat Phil Murphy received 4,331 votes (58.6% vs. 65.2% countywide), ahead of Republican Kim Guadagno with 2,902 votes (39.2% vs. 32.6%), and other candidates with 162 votes (2.2% vs. 2.1%), among the 7,458 ballots cast by the township's 17,609 registered voters, for a turnout of 42.4%. In the 2013 gubernatorial election, Republican Chris Christie received 60.8% of the vote (4,504 cast), ahead of Democrat Barbara Buono with 37.8% (2,804 votes), and other candidates with 1.4% (105 votes), among the 7,532 ballots cast by the township's 16,527 registered voters (119 ballots were spoiled), for a turnout of 45.6%. In the 2009 gubernatorial election, Republican Chris Christie received 4,381 votes (50.8% vs. 41.7% countywide), ahead of Democrat Jon Corzine with 3,480 votes (40.4% vs. 50.6%), Independent Chris Daggett with 633 votes (7.3% vs. 5.9%) and other candidates with 68 votes (0.8% vs. 0.8%), among the 8,619 ballots cast by the township's 16,122 registered voters, yielding a 53.5% turnout (vs. 46.5% in the county).

United States Senate election results for Scotch Plains1
Year	Republican		Democratic		Third party(ies)	
Year	No.	%	No.	%	No.	%
2024	5,282	37.32%	8,631	60.97%	242	1.71%
2018	4,045	40.48%	5,563	55.67%	384	3.84%
2012	4,850	42.56%	6,331	55.55%	216	1.90%
2006	3,895	48.09%	4,052	50.02%	153	1.89%

United States Senate election results for Scotch Plains2
Year	Republican		Democratic		Third party(ies)	
Year	No.	%	No.	%	No.	%
2020	5,499	36.59%	9,332	62.10%	197	1.31%
2014	2,897	41.60%	3,974	57.06%	93	1.34%
2013	2,203	43.50%	2,826	55.81%	35	0.69%
2008	5,438	46.54%	6,037	51.67%	209	1.79%

== Education ==
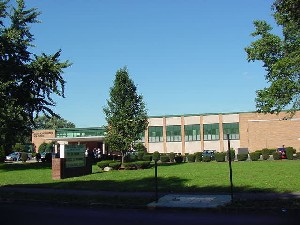
Scotch Plains-Fanwood High School

Public school students in Scotch Plains attend the schools of the Scotch Plains-Fanwood Regional School District, which serves students in pre-kindergarten through twelfth grade from the Fanwood and Scotch Plains. The district has five elementary schools (PreK–4), two middle schools (grades 5–8) and a comprehensive high school (grades 9–12). As of the 2023–24 school year, the district, comprised of eight schools, had an enrollment of 5,758 students and 451.7 classroom teachers (on an FTE basis), for a student–teacher ratio of 12.8:1. Schools in the district (with 2023–24 enrollment data from the National Center for Education Statistics) are Howard B. Brunner Elementary School with 415 students in grades PreK–4, J. Ackerman Coles School with 548 students in grades PreK–4, Evergreen School with 425 students in grades PreK–4, William J. McGinn School with 549 students in grades K–4, School One Elementary School with 412 students in grades PreK–4, Malcolm E. Nettingham Middle School with 933 students in grades 5–8, Terrill Middle School with 834 students in grades 5–8 and Scotch Plains-Fanwood High School with 1,551 students in grades 9–12. Seats on the nine-member board of education are allocated based on the population of the constituent districts, with seven seats assigned to Scotch Plains.

The Union County Vocational Technical Schools includes the Union County Magnet High School, the Academy for Information Technology, the Union County Academy for Allied Health Sciences, the Union County Academy for Performing Arts and the Vocational-Technical School. The grouping of different schools is for vocational as well as gifted students, publicly funded by the combined taxes of Union County municipalities.

Union Catholic Regional High School (often abbreviated UC), a private Roman Catholic school, brings in students from Union County and parts of Essex and Middlesex counties and operates under the supervision of the Roman Catholic Archdiocese of Newark. The Newark Archdiocese also supervises operation of the K–8 St. Bartholomew Academy.

Union County College has a facility in Scotch Plains.

== Transportation ==
=== Roads and highways ===
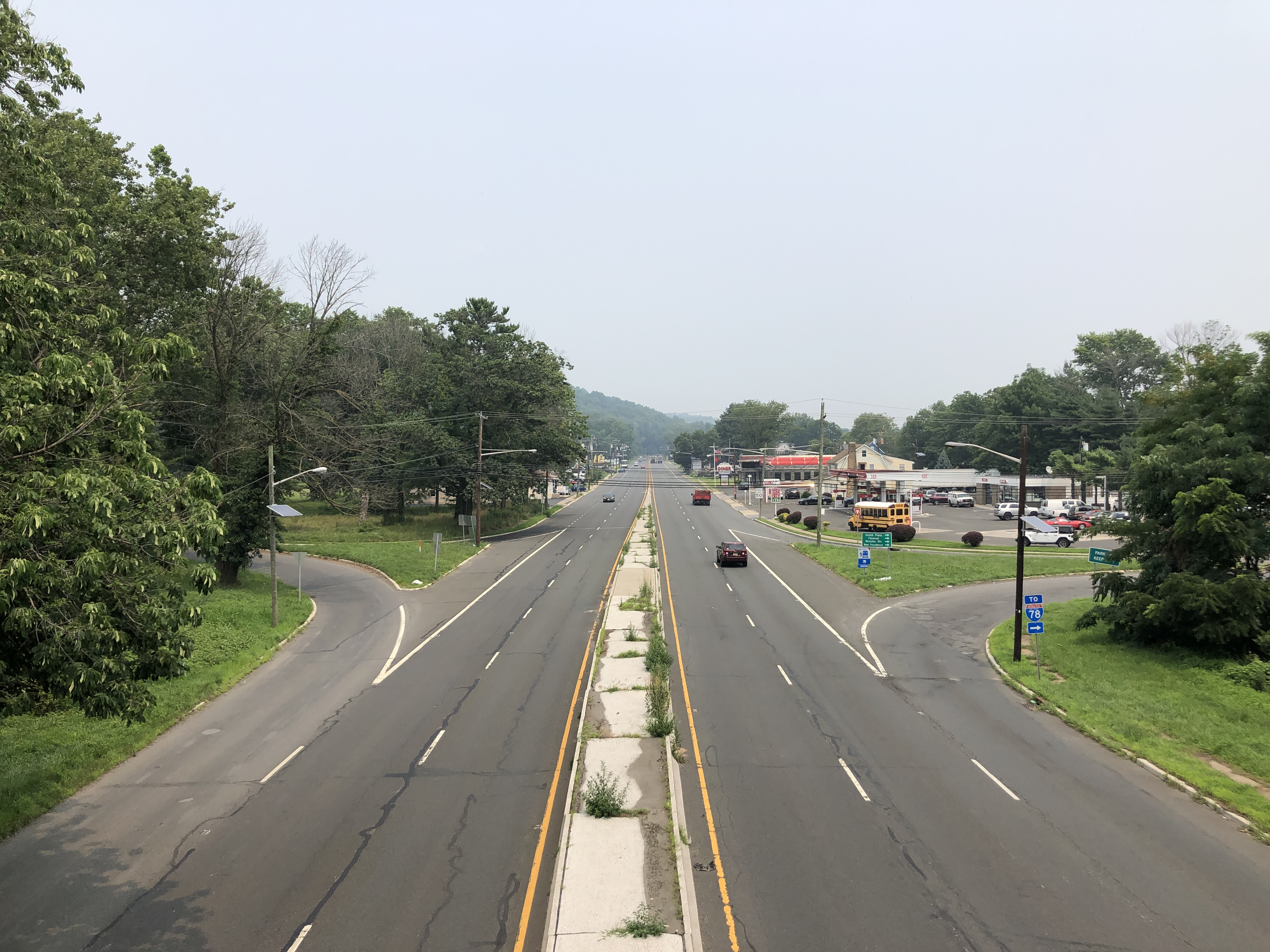
U.S. Route 22 eastbound at Park Avenue in Scotch Plains

As of May 2010, the township had a total of 89.39 miles (143.86 km) of roadways, of which 75.06 miles (120.80 km) were maintained by the municipality, 11.95 miles (19.23 km) by Union County and 2.38 miles (3.83 km) by the New Jersey Department of Transportation.

The two major roads that pass through are Route 28 for a brief stretch in the central part and U.S. Route 22 in the north.

The township is accessible from major limited access highways in neighboring communities, such as Interstate 78 in both Watchung and Berkeley Heights, the Garden State Parkway in Clark and Interstate 287 in Edison Township.

=== Public transportation ===
Scotch Plains is bisected by NJ Transit's Raritan Valley Line, formerly the mainline of the Central Railroad of New Jersey. A passenger station is located in Fanwood. Another rail line, the Lehigh Line, carries freight trains through the southernmost tip of the township.

New Jersey Transit offers service on the 112, 113, 114 and 117 routes to the Port Authority Bus Terminal in Midtown Manhattan, and service to Newark on the 59, 65 and 66 (Limited) routes.

Newark Liberty International Airport is approximately 14 miles (23 km) east of Scotch Plains, most conveniently reached via Route 22, and Linden Airport, a general aviation facility is in nearby Linden, New Jersey. Newark Liberty International Airport is also accessible via New Jersey Transit train by transferring from the Raritan Valley Line to the Northeast Corridor Line at Newark Penn Station.

Scotch Plains also has access to Amtrak service, by taking the Raritan Valley Line to Newark Penn Station. This gives Scotch Plains rail access to destinations along the entire east coast.

== News coverage ==
The township falls in the New York media market, with daily news being based in New York City. Its weekly newspaper of record is the Scotch Plains-Fanwood Times, also publisher of the neighboring town's newspaper of record, The Westfield Leader.

== Points of interest ==
- The Aunt Betty Frazee House is a farmhouse of a colonial-era couple Gershom and Elizabeth Frazee, the latter of whom was approached by British generals in 1777 who sought to buy bread she'd been baking that day. Aunt Betty's famous retort ("I offer this bread not in love but in fear"—whereupon the generals courteously abandoned their effort to buy) puts her in company with Betsy Ross, Molly Pitcher and other women who distinguished themselves in the American Revolution. Her house is on state and national historic registers, and many in the community are seeking a way of restoring the house (at 1451 Raritan Road) to honor Betty's story and secure it in American history.
- Osborn-Cannonball House Museum is a historic home located at 1840 Front Street that is operated by The Historical Society of Scotch Plains and Fanwood New Jersey.
- Hillside Cemetery is the burial site of Dudley Moore and Senator James Edgar Martine.
- The Stage House Inn was constructed in 1737 and is still in use as a bar/restaurant. It was a primary meeting place for troop messengers and officers during the Revolutionary War; in fact, General Lafayette is known to have stopped at the inn while General George Washington was nearby.
- John's Meat Market is the site of Mr. T's reality TV show for TV Land.
- John H. Stamler Police Academy trains officers and volunteers throughout Union County and is located on Raritan Road.
- The Jewish Federation of Central New Jersey has its Jewish Community Center and offices on Martine Avenue.

== Notable people ==
People who were born in, residents of, or otherwise closely associated with Scotch Plains include:

- Audrey Assad (born 1983), contemporary Christian music artist with Sparrow Records
- Alan Augustine (1928–2001), politician who served as Mayor of Scotch Plains, councilman, freeholder and in the New Jersey General Assembly, representing the 22nd Legislative District
- Thomas J. Barr (1812–1881), politician who represented New York's 4th congressional district from 1859 to 1861
- Hank Beenders (1916–2003), early professional basketball player
- Carol Bellamy (born 1942), former executive director of UNICEF and director of the Peace Corps
- David Blitzer (born 1970), senior executive at the Blackstone Group, part-owner of the New Jersey Devils of the National Hockey League, Philadelphia 76ers of the National Basketball Association
- Judy Blume (born 1938), author, lived in Scotch Plains while writing the classic Fudge series of children's books
- Derrick Caracter (born 1988), power forward/center for the University of Texas-El Paso Miners team who was drafted by the Los Angeles Lakers in the 2010 NBA Draft
- Abraham Coles (1813–1891), physician, translator, author and poet
- Ezra Darby (1768–1808), politician who represented New Jersey's at-large congressional district from 1805 until his death
- Donald DiFrancesco (born 1944), former Governor of New Jersey and Senate President
- Pat DiNizio (1955–2017), singer/songwriter for The Smithereens
- Jerome Epstein (born 1937), politician who served in the New Jersey Senate and then went to federal prison for pirating oil
- John Gano (1727–1804), chaplain who baptized George Washington
- Rashan Gary (born 1997), defensive tackle for the Michigan Wolverines football team
- Ashton Gibbs (born 1990), starting point-guard for the Pittsburgh Panthers men's basketball team
- Sterling Gibbs (born 1993), professional basketball player for Kolossos Rodou of the Greek Basket League
- Scott Goldblatt (born 1979), swimmer who won a gold medal at the 2004 Summer Olympics in Athens and a silver medal at the 2000 Summer Olympics in Sydney, Australia, with both medals earned in the 4 × 200 m Freestyle Relay
- Jeffrey Hammonds (born 1971), former MLB outfielder who had one all-star appearance in his 13 seasons
- Isaac Heller (1926–2015), toy manufacturer who co-founded Remco
- Jerome Hines (1921–2003), opera singer
- Tom Jackson (born 1948), former football player and coach who was head football coach at the University of Connecticut from 1983 to 1993
- Nate Jones (born 1982), cornerback for the Denver Broncos.
- Hillary Klimowicz (born 1987), basketball player who has played for Limoges ABC
- Christian J. Lambertsen (1917–2011), environmental medicine and diving medicine specialist who developed the United States Navy frogmen's rebreathers in the early 1940s and created the acronym "SCUBA"
- Mary LeSawyer (1917–2004), opera singer
- Joseph Malchow (born 1985), technology executive and venture capital investor
- Bryan Meredith (born 1989), goalkeeper who has played for the Seattle Sounders FC and San Jose Earthquakes of the MLS
- Angelo Mongiovi (born 1952), wheelchair track, basketball and rugby athlete inducted into the United States Quad Rugby Association Hall of Fame
- James Murphy (born 1997), soccer player who currently plays as a midfielder for USL Championship club Rio Grande Valley FC
- John Murphy (born 2000), soccer player who last played as a midfielder for USL Championship club Loudoun United FC
- Renaldo Nehemiah (born 1959), track star who set world record in the 110 meter hurdles, NFL wide receiver for the San Francisco 49ers and the only four-time winner of ABC's Superstar competition
- Louise Townsend Nicholl (1890–1981), poet and editor
- Amy Ellis Nutt (born 1955), journalist and New York Times bestselling author, who was the recipient of the 2011 Pulitzer Prize for Feature Writing for her reporting at The Star-Ledger
- Thomas W. Osborn (1833–1898), Union Army officer who represented Florida in the United States Senate
- John Pak (born 1998), golfer
- Joe J. Plumeri (born 1944), Chairman and CEO of Willis Group and owner of the Trenton Thunder
- John F. Rague (1799–1877), architect who designed and built the 1837 Old Capitol of Illinois and the 1840 Territorial Capitol of Iowa
- Cynthia Sayer (born 1956), jazz banjoist
- Joe Scarpati (born 1943), holder for Tom Dempsey's record 63-yard (58 m) field goal in 1970
- Alan Sepinwall (born 1973), television reviewer and writer.
- Marc Shaiman (born 1959), composer and arranger who has worked on the musical Hairspray and the film South Park: Bigger, Longer & Uncut
- John Shippen (1879–1968), first American golf professional and first African American to compete in the U.S. Open
- John H. Stamler (1938–1990), Union County, New Jersey prosecutor, who was New Jersey's first three-term County Prosecutor
- Enzo Stuarti (1919–2005), tenor, musical theater performer
- Samuel Swan (1771–1844), physician and politician who represented New Jersey's at-large congressional district from 1821 to 1831
- Lance Thomas (born 1988), power forward / center for the New York Knicks
- Frank Thorne (born 1930), comic book artist and writer best known for popularizing the Marvel Comics character Red Sonja
- Troi Torain (born 1964), radio host and "Star" of Star and Bucwild
- David S. Ware (born 1949), jazz musician
- Melissa Murphy Weber (born 1969), attorney and politician who served in the Pennsylvania House of Representatives from 2003 to 2004.
- Allen Weh (born 1942), business executive, politician and retired colonel in the United States Marine Corps Reserve
