= Union County Magnet High School =

High school in Union County, New Jersey, US

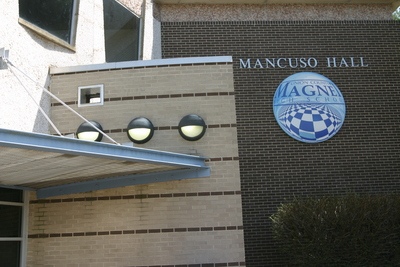

Location
- 1776 Raritan Road; Scotch Plains, Union County, New Jersey 07076; United States; 40.618735°N 74.358361°W

Information
- Type: Magnet public high school
- Established: 1997
- School district: Union County Vocational Technical Schools
- NCES School ID: 341804000214
- Principal: Adam Moskowitz
- Faculty: 14.9 FTEs
- Grades: 9-12
- Enrollment: 311 (as of 2023–24)
- Student to teacher ratio: 20.9:1
- Colors: Blue and silver
- Accreditation: Middle States Association of Colleges and Schools
- Website: mhs.ucvts.org

The Union County Magnet High School (UCMHS) is a magnet public high school located in Scotch Plains on the Union County Vocational Technical Schools Campus, serving the vocational and technical educational needs of students in ninth through twelfth grades throughout Union County, in the U.S. state of New Jersey. The school's goal is to prepare students for college/vocational training utilizing technology through problem solving, project-based learning, and interdisciplinary education. Students must apply to enter the school and the school accepts one-thirds of applicants. The school is accredited until July 2031 and has been accredited by the Middle States Association of Colleges and Schools Commission on Elementary and Secondary Schools since 2001.

As of the 2023–24 school year, the school had an enrollment of 311 students and 14.9 classroom teachers (on an FTE basis), for a student–teacher ratio of 20.9:1. There were 15 students (4.8% of enrollment) eligible for free lunch and 5 (1.6% of students) eligible for reduced-cost lunch.

== History ==
The concept of a magnet high school for Union County was first proposed by Superintendent Thomas Bistocchi in December 1995. After originally rejecting the proposal in August 1996, the Union County Board of Chosen Freeholders approved $5.1 million in funding for the school in February 1997. The school opened to students in September 1997, with the first class of 51 students graduating in June 2001. The building was dedicated in honor of Board of Education president Charles Mancuso in March 1998.

== Awards, recognition and rankings ==
Union County Magnet High School was recognized by Governor Jim McGreevey in 2003 as one of 25 schools selected statewide for the First Annual Governor's School of Excellence award.

Union County Magnet High School was awarded the Blue Ribbon School Award of Excellence by the United States Department of Education, the highest award an American school can receive, during the 2004–05 school year. In September 2013, the school was honored for a second time when it was one of 15 in New Jersey to be recognized by the Department of Education as part of the National Blue Ribbon Schools Program, an award called the "most prestigious honor in the United States' education system" and which Education Secretary Arne Duncan described as honoring schools that "represent examples of educational excellence".

Union County Magnet High School was cited as a "Public Elite", one of 22 such schools recognized nationwide in Newsweek magazine's listing of "America's Best High Schools" in the May 8, 2006, issue. Newsweek described that the school's "Focus is on science, math and technology".

In Newsweek's May 22, 2007 issue, ranking the country's top high schools, Union County Magnet High School was listed in 598th place, the 12th-highest ranked school in New Jersey.

In 2005–06, the school averaged a 1922 combined SAT score, fourth highest of all public high schools statewide.

In 2008, Magnet High School, along with the Academy for Allied Health Sciences, was named #1 youth per capita in the entire nation by the American Cancer Society for their Relay for Life. In total, the schools raised over $73,000.

In 2009, Magnet High School, along with the other UCVTS schools, was named #1 youth per capita in the entire nation by the American Cancer Society for their Relay For Life program. In total, the schools raised over $115,000.

Schooldigger.com ranked the school as one of 16 schools tied for first out of 381 public high schools statewide in its 2011 rankings (unchanged from the 2010 ranking) which were based on the combined percentage of students classified as proficient or above proficient on the language arts literacy (100.0%) and mathematics (100.0%) components of the High School Proficiency Assessment (HSPA).

In 2011, Magnet High School was named a Silver Medal School and ranked #70 in the Nation as one of the best math and science high school according to U.S. News & World Report.

In its 2013 report on "America's Best High Schools", The Daily Beast ranked the school 65th in the nation among participating public high schools and 5th among schools in New Jersey. The school was ranked 102nd in the nation and fifth in New Jersey on the list of "America's Best High Schools 2012" prepared by The Daily Beast / Newsweek, with rankings based 25% each on graduation rate, matriculation rate for college and number of Advanced Placement / International Baccalaureate courses taken per student, with 10% based on average scores on the SAT / ACT, 10% on AP/IB scores and an additional 5% based on the number of AP/IB courses available to students.

In Newsweek's 2014 "America's Best High Schools", Magnet was ranked 2nd in the nation.

In its listing of "America's Best High Schools 2016", the school was ranked 4th out of 500 best high schools in the country; it was ranked 2nd among all high schools in New Jersey.

== Legal issues ==
There are 21 municipal school districts that are contained within the Union County Vocational Technical Schools District (UCVTSD). Following the creation of this school in 1997, a number of these districts filed suit against UCMHS. Scotch Plains petitioned the New Jersey Department of Education to force the exclusion of students from their district from the Magnet School. Rahway, New Jersey refused to allow Rahway students attending Magnet to participate in Rahway extracurricular programs. Their argument was that Magnet was taking the best students away from the home districts and that Magnet was drawing funds away from the home districts.

The final case against UCMHS was the case launched by the City of Linden. It was resolved late in 2002 in favor of UCMHS. Linden ran a science school within its own district where it sent its gifted and talented students. They argued that their program was comparable to UCMHS and they should not, therefore, be required to pay tuition for students attending the county school. The UCMHS argued that the programs were not comparable, as evidenced by Linden students desiring to leave their home district in favor of Magnet.

Magnet won each of these suits because it is, legally, a Vocational-Technical school (a school which offers a vocational education) and offers vocational certifications. State law requires local school districts pay tuition for students who attend the county vocational school.

Recently, as a result of extensive state budget cuts, the Board of Education of the Springfield Public Schools announced its plan in 2010 to refuse to pay tuition for students attending several of the schools on the UCVTS campus, on the grounds that it has comparable programs in engineering, performing arts, and health-care training. The Springfield Board of Education believes that, in the absence of any state funding to offset the cost of sending students to the Magnet, Performing Arts, and Allied Health high schools, it should not be obligated to pay to send its students to these schools.

== Notable alumni ==
- Anastasia Bogdanovski (born 1993), swimmer who represented Macedonia in the 2016 Summer Olympics
- Griffin Maxwell Brooks (born 2000), college diver, TikTok influencer, and self-described "digital club kid" and socialite
- Raj Mukherji (born 1984), businessman, lawyer, actor and politician, who has represented the 32nd legislative district in the New Jersey Senate since 2024
