= Academy for Information Technology =

Magnet school in Union County, New Jersey, US

Location
- 1776 Raritan Road; Scotch Plains, Union County, New Jersey 07076; United States; 40.618735°N 74.358361°W

Information
- Type: Magnet public high school
- Established: September 2002
- School district: Union County Vocational Technical Schools
- NCES School ID: 341804006134
- Principal: Paul DeFrancesco
- Faculty: 14.4 FTEs
- Grades: 9-12
- Enrollment: 307 (as of 2024–25)
- Student to teacher ratio: 21.3:1
- Colors: Gold, Blue
- Team name: AIT
- Accreditation: Middle States Association of Colleges and Schools
- Website: ait.ucvts.org

The Union County Academy for Information Technology (UC-AIT) is a full-time four-year public high school located in Scotch Plains, in Union County, in the U.S. state of New Jersey, on the Union County Vocational Technical Schools Campus. The school is part of the Union County Vocational Technical Schools (UCVTS), which serves students in all of Union County. AIT focuses on education in computer science and computer engineering with an emphasis on mathematics and science.

As of the 2024–25 school year, the school had an enrollment of 307 students and 14.4 classroom teachers (on an FTE basis), for a student–teacher ratio of 21.3:1. There were 17 students (5.5% of enrollment) eligible for free lunch and 10 (3.3% of students) eligible for reduced-cost lunch.

The school is accredited by the Middle States Association of Colleges and Schools Commission on Elementary and Secondary Schools through July 2025.

== Recognition and rankings ==
In September 2013, the academy was one of 15 schools in New Jersey to be recognized by the United States Department of Education as part of the National Blue Ribbon Schools Program, which Education Secretary Arne Duncan described as schools that "represent examples of educational excellence".

In its 2016 report on "America's Best High Schools", The Daily Beast ranked the school 23rd in the nation among participating public high schools and 9th among schools in New Jersey.

== Academic graduation requirements ==
In order to graduate from the Academy for Information Technology, a student is required to have taken:

- Four years of English
  - Freshmen: English I - World Literature
  - Sophomore: English II - Early American Literature
  - Junior: English III - Modern American Literature
  - Senior: English IV: Choice of four courses (British Literature, AP English Language and Composition, AP English Literature and Composition, or AP Research (if students are enrolled within the two year AP Capstone Program)
- Four years of Mathematics. Mathematics courses depend on an individual's skill level, which is determined based on an initial assessment in the 8th grade year. Students are placed into one of the following classes each year:
  - Combined Algebra (Algebra 1 & 2)
  - Geometry/Trigonometry
  - Math Analysis (Pre-Calculus)
  - Calculus
  - AP Calculus I/AB
  - AP Calculus II/BC
  - Multivariable Calculus
  - Linear Algebra
  - Mathematical Statistics and Data Sciences
  - Business Intelligence and Analytics (required senior year math course for Business Track students)
  - Probability & Statistics
  - AP Statistics
- Four years of Science
  - Freshmen: Biology I, Scientific Inquiry and Analysis
  - Sophomore: Chemistry I
  - Junior: Physics I
  - Senior: Choice of: AP Biology, AP Chemistry, AP Physics C: Mechanics, AP Physics C: Electricity and Magnetism, Anatomy and Physiology, AP Psychology, Introduction to Chemical Engineering, Biochemistry, Agricultural Science, Introduction to Sustainability, Bioinformatics, etc.
- Four years of Fitness/Health
  - Freshman: Fitness I, Health I
  - Sophomore: Fitness II, Health II
  - Junior: Fitness III, Health III
  - Senior: Fitness IV, Health IV
- Four years of Computer Science / Business (at junior year students decide to pursue a computer science track or business track)
  - Freshmen: Computer Applications in Business - MOS Certifications in Microsoft Word, PowerPoint, and Excel and IC3 Digital Literacy Certifications
  - Sophomore: AP Computer Science Principles AND Principles of Business and Finance
  - Junior:
    - Computer Science Track: AP Computer Science A
    - Business Track: AP Economics (Macro/Micro)
  - Senior:
    - Computer Science Track: Advanced Software Development
    - Business Track: Global Financial Markets and Investments
- Three years of Social Studies
  - Freshmen: World History
  - Sophomore: US History I
  - Junior: US History II
- Three years of World Language. World Language courses depend on an individual's skill level, which is determined based on an initial assessment in the 8th-grade year.
  - Spanish I - Spanish IV
  - AP Spanish Language and Culture
  - AP Spanish Literature and Culture
  - Linguistics
- One half-year of Financial Literacy
  - This requirement is integrated into Principles of Business and Finance during sophomore year.
- One quarter-year of Visual, Performing, and/or Practical Arts
  - This requirement is integrated into Health II education.
