= John Cuneo =

John Cuneo may refer to:

- John Cuneo (illustrator) (born 1957), American illustrator
- John Cuneo (sailor) (1928–2020), Australian sailor
