= Gabrielle Yablonsky =

American art historian (born 1939)

- Born: November 6, 1939 (age 86); East Orange, New Jersey, U.S.
- Occupation: Art historian
- Awards: Guggenheim Fellowship (1974)

Academic background
- Education: Bryn Mawr College (BA); Boston University (MFA); Yale University (MA)

Academic work
- Sub-discipline: Bhutanese art

Gabrielle Yablonsky (born November 6, 1939) is an American art historian specializing in Bhutanese art. She is a 1974 Guggenheim Fellow.

== Biography ==
Gabrielle Yablonsky was born on November 6, 1939, in East Orange, New Jersey. Raised in Westfield, New Jersey, she graduated in 1957 from Westfield High School with awards in both art and French language. She obtained a BA from Bryn Mawr College in 1961, an MFA from Boston University in 1965, and an MA from Yale University in 1966. She also spent a year at the University of Paris (1959-1960).

From 1966 to 1967, Yablonsky was an art instructor at Lowell State College (1966-1967), as well as an art adjunct instructor at Wellesley College. In 1969, she worked in Indonesia as a photographer for the American Society of Eastern Arts. She wrote Handicrafts of Bhutan, a catalogue for the Asia 72 fair, published by the Bhutanese government in 1972. She traveled throughout South Asia for her academic work, as well as in Africa.

In 1974, Yablonsky was awarded a Guggenheim Fellowship "for a study of the living arts of the Himalayas". This fellowship allowed her to work on a book on Bhutanese art, including three years of travel throughout the Bhutanese woods; Karen Herman of the Courier News called the project "the only complete book on the little-publicized country". Yablonsky said that she decided to study visual arts, art history, and photography because her book project "required a hybrid person" skilled in all three areas. She was a speaker at the 9th Seminar of the International Association of Tibetan Studies in 2000.

Yablonsky studied at University of California, Los Angeles as a doctoral student. During her dissertation work, a friend of Yablonsky's was moving her collection of Bhutanese art and media to his apartment for safekeeping while she was on an extended trip when it was stolen from their car's trunk. She has also taught at the University of Texas at Austin, the University of California, Santa Cruz, and the University of Oregon.

Yablonsky lived in Westfield, New Jersey.
