= Stember =

Stember is a surname. Notable people with the surname include:

- Jeff Stember (born 1958), American baseball player
- Michael Stember (born 1978), American track and field athlete
