= John Cuneo (illustrator) =

American illustrator (born 1957)

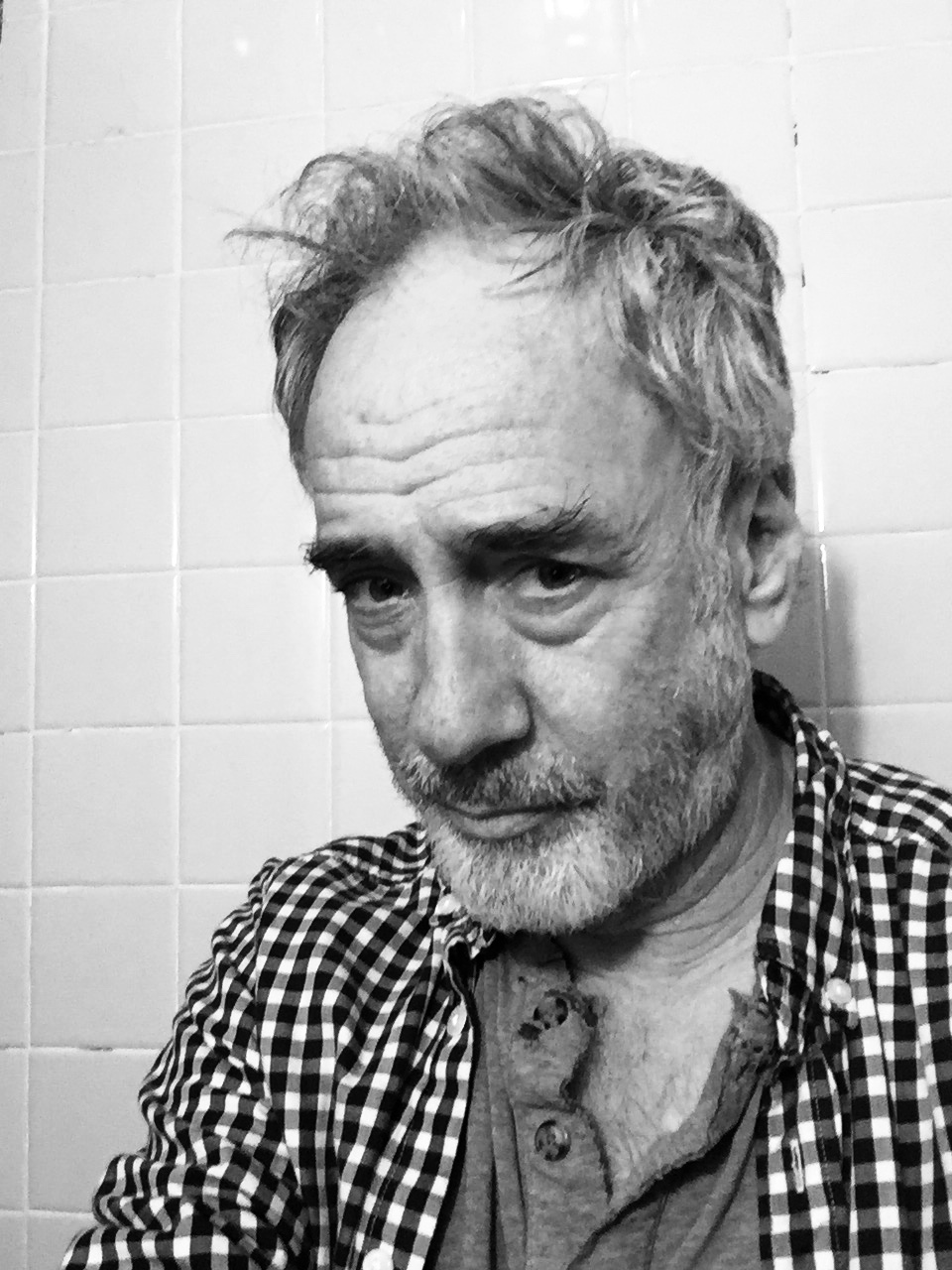
- Born: January 4, 1957 (age 69); Westfield, New Jersey, US
- Known for: Illustration
- Awards: Hamilton King Award, 2012; Multiple Society of Illustrators medal-winner

John Cuneo (born January 4, 1957) is an American illustrator whose work has appeared in publications, including The New Yorker, Esquire, Sports Illustrated and The Atlantic Monthly. His ink and watercolor drawings have been described as covering everything from politics to sex.

== Early life and education ==
Cuneo grew up in Westfield, New Jersey. His father worked as a manager at a plant nursery and his mother as a house wife. He was the oldest of three boys. He and his two brothers worked at the nursery with his father and take home produce to sell at a stand on their front lawn. At the age of 14, he learned to draw from a neighbor, Adelaide Johnson.

Cuneo attended Roosevelt Jr. High, followed by Westfield High School until his junior year, when his family moved to Florida. Once in Florida, Cuneo would graduate from Lely High School in Naples, Florida, in 1975 and go on to attend Florida State University for one year, followed by Colorado Institute of Art for an additional year.

At Colorado Institute for Art, Cuneo learned graphic design business skills, including paste-ups with wax, making storyboards, and rendering typefaces. Bill Kastan, a local illustrator as well as an instructor at the school, befriended Cuneo and provided him with a drawing table in his studio and helped him put together a portfolio.

In 1977, while in Denver, Cuneo joined a group of freelance illustrators headed by Joe Malone going under the name of No Coast Graphics, where he did freelance illustrations for The Denver Post as well as Westword. It was also in Denver where Cuneo met his wife Jan Larson.

== Illustration career ==
Cuneo moved from Denver to San Francisco in 1986, and it was there that he decided to devote himself entirely to work in editorial illustration. His first published work for a major magazine appeared in Sierra Magazine, under the art direction of Martha Geering. In 1993, Cuneo returned to Denver and remained there for eight years. After his return to Denver, Cuneo began receiving assignments from Entertainment Weekly.

In 2001, Cuneo and his wife moved to Woodstock, New York. Soon after, John Korpics, design director at Esquire, brought in Cuneo in 2002 to publish a series of comics called Damned Good Advice, which ran until 2003, and to illustrate the magazine's sex advice column, which ran until 2014. Work on the sex column for Esquire led to two silver awards for Cuneo from the Society of Illustrators.

Cuneo's "Flu Season" appeared on the October 26, 2009 issue of The New Yorker. His second cover for The New Yorker, "Dog Meets Dog", which ran on the June 27, 2011 issue and art directed by Francoise Mouly, won the Hamilton King Award in 2012. Cuneo's August 5, 2013 New Yorker cover featured Anthony Weiner straddling the top of the Empire State Building. That cover led to a silver medal from the Society of Illustrators. In total, as of 2021, Cuneo has created ten covers for the New Yorker.

In 2010, Cuneo joined Golf Digest at the Masters Tournament to draw on location and record his impressions of the event. He is a regular contributor to Golf Digest.

=== Books ===
In 2004, Steven Guarnaccia, who was head of the illustration department at Parsons, recommended Cuneo's sketchbooks to Fantagraphics. Editor Eric Reynolds got in touch to discuss compiling some of the sketchbook work into a book. Robert Festino, who Cuneo had worked with at Entertainment Weekly, put together a dummy of a book during his off-hours at the Entertainment Weekly offices. The mockup was sent to Fantagraphics and co-publisher Kim Thompson went ahead with plans to publish nEuROTIC. The cover illustration chosen for the book had previously won a gold medal from the Society of Illustrators, and the book was released in 2007, designed and art directed by Robert Festino.

Ten years after nEuROTIC, Gary Groth, publisher at Fantagraphics, suggested a sequel to Cuneo. While nEuRoTIC had been drawn almost entirely using a Rapidograph, the pieces in the new collection for Not Waving But Drawing were created using a Uni-ball roller pen or a Micron pen. The book was released in 2017.

In 2017, Cuneo illustrated the book Who Is Rich?, authored by Matthew Klam, published By Random House.

Fantagraphics published Cuneo's third collection of sketchbook drawings in 2021. Coping Skills was described by New Yorker art editor Françoise Mouly as "scabrous and depraved" in nature.

== Group exhibitions ==
- State of the Art:Illustration 100 Years After Howard Pyle, Delaware Art Museum, 2013

== Awards ==
=== Society of illustrators ===
- Silver Medal for uncommissioned work FU, Society of Illustrators, 2016
- Silver Medal for New Yorker cover, Winter Delight, art directed by Francois Mouly, 2016
- Gold Medal for uncommissioned category titled Killed Sex Sketches, 2015
- Silver Medal for New Yorker cover, 'Carlos Danger', art directed by Franciose Mouly, 2014
- Silver Medal for Town and Country magazine article, Erotic Art, art directed by Edward Leida, 2013
- Silver Medal for a drawing titled Julip in the Good Dog column in Garden & Gun magazine, art directed by Marshall McKinney, 2012
- Hamilton King Award, for New Yorker cover, Dog Meets Dog. art directed by Francoise Mouly, 2012
- Silver Medal, Society of Illustrators, 2010
- Silver Medal for Frog Calendar (Poster), Dellas Graphics, art directed by Jim Burke, 2006
- Silver Medal for Esquire magazine's sex advice column, Is Al Green Good for your Sex Life?, art directed by John Korpics, 2006
- Gold Medal for an uncommissioned piece which subsequently became the cover for nEuROTIC, designer Robert Festino, 2004
- Silver Medal for Esquire magazine's sex advice column, art directed by John Korpics, 2004

=== Society of Illustrators, San Francisco ===
- Gold Medal, 1995
- Judge's Appreciation, 1995
- Best of Show, 1995
- Silver Medal for Golf Illustrated Magazine, art directed by Bobbi Laberge, 1993
- Judge's Choice for Motorland Magazine, art director by Al Davidson, 1993
- Honorable Mention Humor Award, 1992
- Silver Humor Award, 1991
- Gold Humor Award, 1990

=== Others ===
- Award of Excellence, for The New York Times Book Review, Intoxicating Prose, art directed by Nicholas Blechman, Communication Arts Illustration Annual, 2014

== Personal life ==
The artist lives in Woodstock, New York, with his wife Jan. The couple have one son, Jack Cuneo.
