= Westfield High School (New Jersey) =

High school in Union County, New Jersey, US

Location
- 550 Dorian Road; Westfield, Union County, New Jersey 07090; United States; 40.6442509°N 74.3491722°W

Information
- Type: Public high school
- Established: 1869; 1951 (current location)
- School district: Westfield Public Schools
- NCES School ID: 341776005764
- Principal: Mary Asfendis
- Faculty: 155.4 FTEs
- Grades: 9–12
- Enrollment: 1,776 (as of 2024–25)
- Student to teacher ratio: 11.4:1
- Campus: Suburban
- Colors: Blue and white
- Athletics conference: Union County Interscholastic Athletic Conference (general); Big Central Football Conference (football)
- Team name: Blue Devils
- Accreditation: Middle States Association of Colleges and Schools
- Publication: Folio literary magazine
- Newspaper: Hi's Eye
- Yearbook: The Weather Vane
- Website: www.westfieldnjk12.org/o/whs

Westfield High School, also known as WHS or Westfield Senior High School, is a comprehensive public high school in Westfield, New Jersey, United States. It serves students in ninth through twelfth grades as the lone secondary school of the Westfield Public Schools. It was established in the early 1900s at its original location on Elm Street until 1951 when it was moved to its current location on Dorian Road. The new wing designated for biology, chemistry, physics, and other sciences, along with English as a Second Language (ESL) was completed in 2002. Westfield High School is overseen by the New Jersey Department of Education. The school has been accredited by the Middle States Association of Colleges and Schools Commission on Elementary and Secondary Schools since 1928.

As of the 2024–25 school year, the school had an enrollment of 1,776 students and 155.4 classroom teachers (on an FTE basis), for a student–teacher ratio of 11.4:1. There were 31 students (1.7% of enrollment) eligible for free lunch and 14 (0.8% of students) eligible for reduced-cost lunch.

In 2023, the administration of Westfield High School was criticized for failing to address cyber harassment. According to a report by the Associated Press, several AI-generated nudes of some 14-year-old female students had been distributed among fellow students.

== History ==
The first high school in Westfield was the old brick academy on Mountain Avenue opposite the Presbyterian Church, a town landmark. The minister of the church was the supervisor of it and all the schools in Westfield.

The history of the high school began in 1869 with the opening of the old Prospect School which, at that time, had a staff of five teachers. For the few students who were preparing for college, the school principal taught Latin, Greek, higher mathematics and science. The other teachers taught the elementary subjects. On March 2, 1880, the Board of Education, in its formal minutes, made the first direct reference to a high school in Westfield. When the Lincoln School on Academy Place was erected in 1890, classes of high school level were transferred to it.

In 1900, the high school department was transferred to the newly opened Washington School on Elm Street. Shortly afterward, a regular full four-year high school program, which received state approval, was organized. The high school became an independent unit in January 1916, when it moved to the Elm Street building. The program, chiefly college preparatory, was offered to 306 students by eleven teachers. In 1916, there were 39 students in the graduating class.

In 1923 when the present Roosevelt Intermediate School was opened, Westfield adopted the 6-3-3 plan and designated the Elm Street building, now containing grades 10, 11 and 12, as Westfield High School. Frank N. Neubauer was designated principal, and he remained in that office until his death in 1947. During that time a library was established, a program in athletics and physical education was developed, and opportunities for outstanding experiences in art, industrial arts, music, speech, and dramatics were expanded. It was in this period that guidance services became an integral part of the program, and pupil activities grew to include publications, clubs, social events and student government. In 1947 Robert L. Foose became the second principal of the high school.

By the late 1940s the Elm Street building had become much too small for the ever-growing student body. Students were being housed in the Elm Street building, the old Washington School as an annex, and two temporary structures on Walnut Street. A new high school building became imperative to maintain and expand Westfiel's high educational standards and experiences. The building on Dorian Road was opened on February 4, 1952. The staff, consisting of 42 teachers, taught 725 students in three curricula: business education, college preparatory, and general. In the first commencement from the new building, 203 students were graduated.

Rapid growth in student enrollment necessitated further expansion. In September 1960, the high school gained an addition consisting of 17 new classrooms, two gymnasiums and a cafeteria. In the 1970s, four additional classrooms were added by the acquisition of the two portable buildings on Trinity Place. In 1962 Westfield instituted its first summer school program which was approved by the State Department of Education. With the retirement of Dr. Foose in 1969, Albert R. Bobal became the school's third principal. During the 1970s, each academic department opened its resource center where students could work independently or seek tutorial assistance from teachers. The Department of Special Services opened resource rooms at the high school so that specially trained teachers could help special needs youngsters to succeed. In 1979 Project 79, an alternative school-within-a-school, was created for at-risk students of average or above average ability.

On November 9, 1971, John List murdered his wife, and mother and two other children and then drove to Westfield High School to watch his elder son John Jr., 15, play in a soccer game. After driving John Jr. home, List shot him repeatedly and as misfire evidence showed, his son attempted to defend himself but died.

In 1980, Dr. Robert G. Petix was named the fourth principal of Westfield High School, a position which he maintained until his retirement in June 2006, making him Westfield High School's longest-serving principal. During the 1980s and 1990s, several new additions to the facility and grounds were made, including renovated playing fields outdoors, updated science labs, a new and expanded library/media center, several state-of-the-art computer labs, and a technological infrastructure of approximately 300 networked computers with Internet access. With the opening of the 1988–89 academic year, Westfield High School welcomed ninth graders to its halls for the first time. The last decade of the 20th century was marked by substantial increases in enrollment in the elementary schools that necessitated the construction of additions to all but one of the district's six elementary school buildings. During the first year of the new millennium Westfield taxpayers approved a $22 million referendum bond to accommodate the arrival of these enrollment increases at Westfield High School.

Construction at the high school began during the summer of 2001 with the replacement of all windows and the conversion of two former shop classrooms into four large classrooms for use during the 2001–02 school year. By the spring of 2002, the "portable" classrooms on Trinity Place had been razed in preparation for the construction of a three-story Science wing which began following a ground breaking ceremony in April 2002. At the same time, construction also began inside the existing building. By the end of the summer, a new Student Center and an Art studio classroom had been created by extending the building into the main courtyard, and a renovated Foods Lab was ready to greet students. Work on the expansion of athletic storage facilities and the creation of new teacher work and preparation areas was also finished.

With construction of the new Science wing completed in the spring of 2003, classes in the existing science classrooms and labs in the main building were moved to their new location in the new wing. During the summer of 2003, work was completed on the renovation and air-conditioning of the former science classrooms for use as general purpose classrooms, as well as on other aspects of the referendum construction project, including the creation of a Counseling Suite for the departments of Guidance and Special Education, the expansion of administrative offices, and the renovation of the varsity gymnasium floor and replacement of bleachers.

In July 2008, Westfield High School welcomed its fifth principal, Peter Renwick. Renwick retired in 2017, and was replaced by Dr. Derrick Nelson, the sixth principal of the high school. On April 8, 2019, school officials announced that Dr. Nelson had died on April 7 after donating bone marrow. Mary Asfendis was named in June 2019 as the seventh Westfield High School principal. In December 2021, swastikas were found twice in the school's bathrooms in less than a week. A similar incident happened in March 2022.

== Awards, recognition, and rankings ==
In 1928, Westfield High School was accredited by the Middle States Association of Colleges and Schools in the first group of high schools to be accredited by this association. At the time, it was established as a center for the College Entrance Examination Board (CEEB). Westfield High School is one of the few schools in the nation to hold over 80 consecutive years of accreditation by the Middle States Association of Colleges and Schools. For the 1994–95 school year, Westfield High School was named as a "Star School" by the New Jersey Department of Education, the highest honor that a New Jersey school can achieve.

The school was the 21st-ranked public high school in New Jersey out of 339 schools statewide in New Jersey Monthly magazine's September 2014 cover story on the state's "Top Public High Schools", using a new ranking methodology. The school had been ranked 49th in the state of 328 schools in 2012, after being the 49th-ranked public high school in New Jersey out of 328 schools statewide in New Jersey Monthly's 2012 cover story on the state's "Top Public High Schools", after being ranked 41st in 2010 out of 322 schools listed. The magazine ranked the school 27th in 2008 out of 316 schools. The school was ranked 22nd in the magazine's September 2006 issue, which included 316 schools across the state.

Schooldigger.com ranked the school tied for 55th out of 381 public high schools statewide in its 2011 rankings (an increase of 12 positions from the 2010 ranking) which were based on the combined percentage of students classified as proficient or above proficient on the mathematics (91.9%) and language arts literacy (96.9%) components of the High School Proficiency Assessment (HSPA). In its listing of "America's Best High Schools 2016", the school was ranked 67th out of 500 best high schools in the country; it was ranked 14th among all high schools in New Jersey and second among the state's non-magnet schools. In its 2013 report on "America's Best High Schools", The Daily Beast ranked the school 356th in the nation among participating public high schools and 30th among schools in New Jersey. In the 2011 "Ranking America's High Schools" issue by The Washington Post, the school was ranked 25th in New Jersey and 865th nationwide.

Westfield was listed in 29th place nationwide in Newsweek's 2014 listing of the Top High Schools in America, after finishing in 691st place nationwide in Newsweek's May 8, 2006, issue, listing the Top 1,200 High Schools in the U.S. The school has a theater department.

== Courses ==
Westfield High School offers a comprehensive program of some 165 different courses and 18 Advanced Placement (AP) classes. Some of these classes include business, fine arts, music, and practical arts. Advanced Placement classes are available in AP English Literature and Composition, AP English Language and Composition, AP Spanish Literature, AP French Language, AP Latin Literature, AP Calculus AB, AP Calculus BC, AP Computer Science AB, AP Statistics, AP Biology, AP Chemistry, AP Physics C: Mechanics, AP Physics I, AP United States History, AP United States Government and Politics, AP European History, AP Environmental Science and AP Psychology.

== Extracurricular activities ==
80% of the students participate in co-curricular activities, including 60 different co-curricular activities and 27 varsity athletic teams. The school's marching band won the USBands Group V A national championship in 2015 with their program The Caged Bird Sings.

The band finished second at the 2021 New Jersey Marching Band Directors Association State Championships with the program "Swipe Up". The band finished second at the 2023 New Jersey Marching Band Directors Association State Championships with the program "Unstoppable". The band placed fourth at the 2024 New Jersey Marching Band Directors Association State Championships with the program "Chasing Dreams".

=== Student publications ===
The Westfield High School students produce a number of different publications, including the weekly Hi's Eye student newspaper which is run by four editors, and the Iris magazine. The newspaper maintains its independence through subscriptions, community sponsors, independent fundraising and advertising. Since 1983, Westfield High School students have operated a public-access television cable TV station producing live and single-camera productions. In addition, the literary magazine Folio, the Weather Vane yearbook, and original theatre scripts are also produced by the students.

==== Hi's Eye ====
Hi's Eye is the student-run weekly newspaper at Westfield High School and is New Jersey's only weekly uncensored student newspaper, and one of the few uncensored school publications in the entire country. Hi's Eye has an editorial staff of Print Journalism seniors and is free from administrative prior review. The paper was established in 1935. It publishes 30 issues per year with four sections: news, opinion, features, and arts and entertainment. Historically, the arts and entertainment section was a special monthly edition but in 2022 became a part of the regular production when the sports section was removed and became a separate, online-only, publication Hi's Eye is unique among many student run newspapers in that it is weekly, and that it is completely self-funded.

In September 2011, Hi's Eye unveiled a new online version. Hi's Eye aims to use the website to reach readers more often, and with more news that perhaps cannot always fit in the print version. The blog, which consists of weekly opinion articles, was created in May 2014. In September 2014, Hi's Eye created a Facebook Page, Twitter account, and Instagram account in hopes to reach a broader audience.

Hi's Eye has won numerous national awards and recognitions from the Columbia Scholastic Press Association, American Scholastic Press Association, National Scholastic Press Association, and the New Jersey American Civil Liberties Union. Hi's Eye received First Place with Special Merit from the ASPA for the 2011-2012 school year, a Pacemaker Award from NSPA for 2013, the Gold Medal by the Columbia Scholastic Press Association for 2013-2014 and an All-American honor rating by the National Scholastic Press Association.

=== Varsity sports ===
The Westfield High School Blue Devils compete in the Union County Interscholastic Athletic Conference, which is comprised of public and private high schools in Union County and was established following a reorganization of sports leagues in Northern New Jersey by the New Jersey State Interscholastic Athletic Association (NJSIAA). Prior to the NJSIAA's 2010 realignment, the school had participated in the Watchung Conference, a high school sports association which included public high schools in Essex, Hudson and Union counties. With 1,398 students in grades 10-12, the school was classified by the NJSIAA for the 2019–20 school year as Group IV for most athletic competition purposes, which included schools with an enrollment of 1,060 to 5,049 students in that grade range. The football team competes in Division 5A of the Big Central Football Conference, which includes 60 public and private high schools in Hunterdon, Middlesex, Somerset, Union, and Warren counties, which are broken down into 10 divisions by size and location. The school was classified by the NJSIAA as Group IV North for football for 2024–2026, which included schools with 893 to 1,315 students.

Westfield High School has 28 varsity interscholastic athletic teams, including baseball, boys and girls basketball, boys and girls cross-country, field hockey, football, gymnastics, golf, boys and girls ice hockey, boys and girls lacrosse, boys and girls soccer, boys and girls swimming, boys and girls tennis, softball, spring track and field, boys and girls volleyball, wrestling, cheerleading and winter track, among others. Their main rival in sports are the Scotch Plains-Fanwood High School Raiders, while Cranford and Plainfield both consider Westfield its biggest rival as well. Westfield's football rivalry with Plainfield dates back to 1900, making it one of the oldest active public high school football rivalry in the state. The rivalry with Plainfield was listed at 17th on NJ.com's 2017 list "Ranking the 31 fiercest rivalries in N.J. HS football". The teams have played each other 118 times, with Westfield leading the rivalry with a 66–45–7 overall record, having won their 11th consecutive game in 2023.

The school was recognized by the NJSIAA as the Group IV winner of the Seventh Annual ShopRite Cup in 2009–10, based on the overall performances of the school's athletic teams which included first-place finishes in girls' tennis, boys' cross country, girls' swimming and boys' tennis; second place in girls' soccer and tied for third in football, plus bonus points for having no disqualifications for the winter and spring seasons.

The boys' track team won the spring / outdoor track state championship in Group III in 1940 and the Group IV title in 1977. The boys cross country team won the Group IV state title in 1963, 1966, 1970, 1971, 1973, 1976, 1977, 1979–1981, 1995, 1996 and 2009–2011 and 2023. The 16 state titles won by the program are the fourth-most of any school in the state. In each of the three years from 1994 to 1996, Matt Elmuccio won the individual Group IV cross-country running championship, making him the fifth runner in state history to earn three individual state titles. The boys' track team won the indoor relay championships in Group IV in 1969, 1972 (co-champion with Henry Snyder High School) and 1973.

The boys tennis team won the Group IV state championship in 1970 (defeating Ridgewood High School in the tournament final), 1971 (vs. Ramapo High School), 1975 (vs. Watchung Hills Regional High School), 1978 (vs. Wayne Valley High School), 1981 (vs. Cherry Hill High School East), 1982 (vs. Teaneck High School), 1984 (vs. Cherry Hill East), 1986 (vs. Marlboro High School), 1987 (vs. Vineland High School), 1988 (vs. Teaneck), 2007 (vs. West Windsor-Plainsboro High School South), 2008 (vs. Cherry Hill East), 2009 (vs. Ridgewood), 2010 (vs. Lenape High School), 2016 (vs. Montgomery High School). The program's 15 state titles are the fifth-most of any school in the state. The team won the Tournament of Champions in 2007 (vs. runner-up Newark Academy) and 2010 (vs. Chatham High School). The team won the Group IV state championship defearing Westfield 4-1 in the playoff finals. The team won the 2007 North II, Group IV state sectional championship with three successive 5–0 wins over Phillipsburg High School, J. P. Stevens High School and ultimately Bridgewater-Raritan High School in the tournament final. The team won the 2007 NJSIAA Group IV state championship, defeating West Windsor-Plainsboro High School South 3–2 in the final match. The team moved on to win the Tournament of Champions, defeating Tenafly High School and Newark Academy 4–1 each in the semifinals and finals, respectively. The win gave the team its fifth Tournament of Champions (or equivalent) victory, with previous wins in 1957, 1978, 1986 and 1987. In 2008 and 2009, the tennis team reached the Tournament of Champions finals, losing to Delbarton School and Newark Academy, respectively 3-2 each. The 2010 team won its fourth consecutive Group IV title with a 3–2 win against Lenape in the championship match before defeating Chatham by a 3–2 margin in the finals of the Tournament of Champions at Mercer County Park; the team, which was the second-ranked team in the state by The Star-Ledger, finished the season with a 31–3 record.

The boys track team won the indoor track championship in Group IV in 1970, 1971 (as co-champion), 1986, 1987, 2022 and 2023; the program's seven state championships are tied for ninth in the state. The boys basketball team defeated Triton Regional High School in the final game of the tournament to win the Group IV title in 1972. The field hockey team won the North II Group IV state sectional title in 1975, 1977, 1978 (group runner-up) and 1979 (group runner-up), and won the North I/II combined Group IV title in 1992 (state runner-up).

The football team won the North II Group IV state sectional championships in 1976 and 1977 and won the North II Group V sectional title in 2015-2017. The 1976 team won the North II Group IV sectional title with a 14–0 win against Plainfield High School in the championship game. In 2015, under head Coach Jim DeSarno, the Blue Devils went 12–0 and won the North II Group V state championship with a 10–7 win against Bridgewater-Raritan High School in the tournament final at MetLife Stadium. The team repeated as North II, Group V state sectional champion with a 15–13 win against Bridgewater-Raritan in 2016 in the tournament final, to extend their winning streak to 25 games, then the longest in the state. The team repeated as North II, Group V sectional champion, finishing the season with a 12–0 record and extending their state-longest active winning streak to 37 consecutive games in 2017 with their third straight sectional title win against third-seeded Bridgewater-Raritan by a score of 20–7 in the playoff final at MetLife Stadium.

The girls tennis team won the Group IV state championship in 1976 (defeating runner-up J. P. Stevens High School in the tournament's final round), 1979 (vs. Shawnee High School), 1994 (vs. Middletown High School South), 2005 (vs. East Brunswick High School), 2009 (vs. West Windsor-Plainsboro High School South) and 2010 (vs. Livingston High School). The 2010 team won the Tournament of Champions, defeating runner-up Red Bank Catholic High School 3-2 in the finals. The wrestling team won the North II Group IV state sectional title in 1980 and 1990. The boys' lacrosse team won the overall state championship in 1986 and 1987 (vs. Bridgewater-Raritan High School East both years) and won the Group IV state title in 2014 (vs. Southern Regional High School) and 2024 (vs. Eastern Regional High School). The boys soccer team won the Group IV state title in 1986 (defeating runner-up Hightstown High School in the playoff finals), 1991 (vs. East Brunswick High School), 1995 (vs. Lenape High School).

The girls' soccer team won the Group IV championship in 1988 with a win in the tournament final against East Brunswick High School, as well as in 2021, when they defeated Freehold Township High School 1–0 in the tournament final and finished the season with a record of 21–0–1. The boys' bowling team won the overall state championship in 1994 and the Group IV title in 2008. The 1994 team, with 2,915 pins, finished as overall state champion ahead of Passaic High School, with 2,835.

Westfield has won multiple titles in boys and girls swimming. The boys' team won the Public title in 1958 and 1959, the Boys A championship from 1961 to 1970, 1975 and 1992, and won the Public A title in 1995–1997, 2001, 2003–2005, 2008–2010, 2012–14 and 2016; the girls' team won the Division A title in 1978, 1980–1982, 1985, 1987–1989, and the Public B championship in 1999, and the Public A title in 2007, 2008, 2010–2013. The girls have won 15 state championships – the most of any public school in New Jersey – and 17 Union County Titles, while the boys have won 26 state championships, the most of any team in the state, along with 52 Union County titles; the ten consecutive titles won by the team from 1961 through 1970 are the longest streak for a public school program. The girls' swimming team won the 2007 NJSIAA Group IV state championship over West Windsor-Plainsboro High School South. They were beaten by the South Pirates 90–80 in 2009 having lost many top swimmers. The boys' swimming team won the 2007 North II - A state sectional championship, topping Bridgewater-Raritan High School 93–77 in the tournament final. The girls' swim team duplicated the feat with a 113–57 win over Scotch Plains-Fanwood High School. In 2008, for the first time in school history, both teams won the NJSIAA Public A state championships in the same year, with the boys defeating Cherry Hill High School West by a score of 91–79 and the girls defeating West Windsor-Plainsboro High School South for the second year in a row, 106–64. The boys' swim team won the 2009 Public A state championship with a 101–69 victory over Morristown High School, giving the program its record tying 22nd state championship and the top ranking in the state by The Star-Ledger.

The 2004 softball team won the North II, Group IV state sectional championship with a 1–0 victory over J. P. Stevens High School in the tournament final. The Westfield wrestling program has also seen success. Christian Barber received the 152-lb state title for Westfield in 2011, becoming Westfield's 12th individual state wrestling champion in program history. The Westfield Marching band was second in the state in 2021, and finished first in the state in 2023.

=== Blue Devil Television ===
Beginning in 2021, Blue Devil Television broadcasts 5 days a week Monday-Friday. The morning show consists of morning announcements, news packages, and other spotlights on all of the aspects that make up WHS. BDTV also broadcasts school wide assemblies and the yearly graduation.

== Administration ==
The school's principal is Mary Asfendis, who was named to the position in June 2019. Core members of her administration team are the school's three assistant principals.

== Notable alumni ==
- Marc Acito (born 1966), playwright, novelist and humorist
- Charles Addams (1912–1988), cartoonist for The New Yorker magazine, most famous for his cartoons of The Addams Family
- Virginia Apgar (1909–1974), physician who created the Apgar score for assessing the health of newborns
- Richard Bagger (born 1960, class of 1978), New Jersey Governor Chief of Staff
- Cheryl Barnes (born 1951), singer and actress best known for her role in Miloš Forman's 1979 film adaptation of Hair, where she played the mother of Hud's little son
- Matt Bernstein (born 1998, class of 2017), internet personality and political commentator
- Dave Brown (born 1970), NFL quarterback from 1992–2000 who played for the New York Giants and Arizona Cardinals
- Devin Caherly (born 2001, class of 2019), social media personality
- Chris Campbell (born 1954), wrestler who was a bronze medalist in Freestyle wrestling at the 1992 Summer Olympics in Barcelona
- Steve Cheek (born 1977), NFL punter who played for the San Francisco 49ers, Kansas City Chiefs and Carolina Panthers
- John Chironna (1928–2010), college football player and coach
- Robert "Bob" Clotworthy (1931–2018), Olympic springboard diver who won a bronze medal the 1952 Summer Olympics in Helsinki and a gold medal in Melbourne at the 1956 games
- John Cuneo (born 1957), illustrator, whose work has appeared in The New Yorker, Esquire, Sports Illustrated and The Atlantic
- Robert S. Dietz (1914–1995, class of 1932), marine geologist, geophysicist and oceanographer who conducted pioneering research concerning seafloor spreading
- Edward Einhorn (born 1970), children's author, director and playwright
- Kevin Feige (born 1973), President of Marvel Studios, produced such films as Iron Man and Black Panther
- Joseph Greenspan (born 1992, class of 2011), soccer player for the Pittsburgh Riverhounds SC of the United Soccer League
- Dana Harrison (1960-2018; class of 1977), business professional, arts community and non-profit organizer, producer, director and entrepreneur
- Scott Jacobs (born 1958), painter known for his photorealistic work of Harley-Davidson motorcycles, who became the company's first official licensed artist in 1993
- Robert Kaplow (born 1954), author of the original book made into the film Me and Orson Welles
- Mary Jo Keenen, former television actress
- Kevin Kelly (born 1952), founder of Wired magazine
- Marilyn Lange (born 1952), May 1974 Playboy Playmate
- Gloanna W. MacCarthy (1879–1968), politician who served in the New Jersey General Assembly
- Mark Metcalf (born 1946, class of 1964), actor
- Sy Montgomery (born 1958), naturalist, author and scriptwriter who writes for children and adults
- Laura Overdeck (class of 1987), education reformer, author and philanthropist
- David Perkowski (born 1947, class of 1965), former competition swimmer who represented the United States in the 100-meter breaststroke event at the 1968 Summer Olympics in Mexico City
- Anne Revere (1903–1990), actress who won the Academy Award for Best Supporting Actress for National Velvet
- Andrew Ruotolo (1952–1995), politician who served as the prosecutor of Union County, New Jersey
- Bret Schundler (born 1959, class of 1977), politician who served as New Jersey Commissioner of Education and as mayor of Jersey City from 1992 until 2001
- Coleen Sexton (born 1979, class of 1997), actress who made her Broadway debut at age 20 in Jekyll & Hyde in 2000
- Matthew Sklar (born 1973), Two-time Tony Award and Emmy Award-nominated composer for the Broadway musicals The Prom, Elf and The Wedding Singer
- Jessica St. Clair (born 1976, class of 1994), actress and improvisational comedian
- Jeff Stember (born 1958), former MLB pitcher who started one game for the San Francisco Giants in 1980
- Jeff Torborg (1941–2025; class of 1959), MLB catcher from 1964 to 1973 who played for the Los Angeles Dodgers and California Angels
- Malinda Williams (born 1975), actress, Soul Food on Showtime
- Glen Everett Woolfenden (1930–2007), ornithologist, known for his long-term study of the Florida scrub jay population at Archbold Biological Station near Lake Placid, Florida
- Harold "Butch" Woolfolk (born 1960), running back who played in the NFL from 1982 to 1988 for the New York Giants, Houston Oilers and Detroit Lions
- Gabrielle Yablonsky (born 1939, class of 1957), art historian specializing in Bhutanese art

== Notable faculty ==
- Jean Griswold (1930–2017), entrepreneur
