= Jean Griswold =

American entrepreneur (1930–2017)

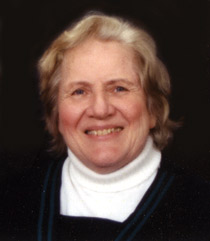
- Born: July 30, 1930; New York City, New York, U.S.
- Died: January 28, 2017 (aged 86); Worcester, Pennsylvania, U.S.

Jean C. Griswold (July 30, 1930 – January 28, 2017) was an American businesswoman. She was the founder of Griswold Home Care, a corporation founded in 1982 to provide non-medical, in-home care for the elderly and infirm. She was the subject of ongoing press attention because she founded a successful corporation despite using a wheelchair because she suffered from multiple sclerosis.

== Education and personal life ==
Griswold earned her bachelor's degree in economics and business administration from Douglass College in New Brunswick, N.J. in 1952. She earned her master's degree in counseling from Rutgers University in 1956.

Jean and her husband, Lincoln Griswold, lived for many years in Erdenheim, Pennsylvania, where Reverend Griswold was pastor of the Chestnut Hill Presbyterian Church.

== Career ==
=== Early career ===
Griswold worked as a guidance counselor at Westfield High School, then as a counselor at the Lutheran Home for the Aged.

=== Founding the home care company ===
In 1982, Griswold founded a home care company for the elderly and disabled. Initially called Overnight Sitting Service prompted by her discovery that there was no company offering overnight companionship for the frail elderly. The first caregivers Griswold hired when she started the company working from her dining room table were seminary students who stayed nights with the elderly. According to Inc. (magazine) by 1989, the company was a $10-million, multi-state business.

The company was soon renamed Special Care Inc., then renamed Griswold Home Care. In 2005, it was described by the Philadelphia Business Journal as, "the nation's largest, privately owned nonmedical home-care company." By 2006, the company had 87 franchises in 16 states and some outside the United States. In 2009, it had 103 franchises. Griswold, who has multiple sclerosis, was in a wheelchair when she founded the company, and continued to work from her wheelchair.

Griswold's son, Kent, served as president of the company, and her husband, Lincoln, a Presbyterian minister, served as chairman of the board.

In 1995, the company attracted media attention when one of its home care employees was arrested while buying illegal drugs, and press reports focused on the fact that since the company does not provide medical services, its employees are not required to be certified and may not be closely supervised.

In 2003–2004, Griswold was Entrepreneur in Residence at the Wharton School of the University of Pennsylvania.

== Recognition ==
Jean has won numerous awards, including the Spirit of Philadelphia Award. She won Working Woman's 2001 Entrepreneur of the Year honor. The National Multiple Sclerosis Society presented Griswold with the 2002 MS National Achievement Award. She was inducted to the Hall of Distinguished Alumni of Rutgers University in 1995. She was awarded an honorary doctorate from Holy Family University in Philadelphia.

On April 27th, 2023, after resolutions in the Pennsylvania House and Senate, a portion of Township Line Road in Montgomery County, PA was dedicated in honor of Jean Griswold.

== Plays, books about Griswold ==
Letter to My Daughter: Adventures of Atypical Women, a one-woman play written and performed by Beth Hirst, profiled Griswold, Isadora Duncan, explorer Mary Kingsley, and environmental activist Julia Butterfly Hill as models of women who overcome challenges to lead lives of great achievement.

In 1999, her story was told in the book "The Courage To Give" by Jackie Waldman. Her story was published in the 2010 book Women of Spirit, by Katherine Martin.

== Books by Jean Griswold ==
- Griswold, Jean C. (2013). Fears Of The Elderly. ISBN 978-1484912898.
