= Gloanna W. MacCarthy =

American politician

Gloanna Wallace MacCarthy (September 16, 1879 - January 1968) was an American Republican Party politician who served three terms in the New Jersey General Assembly.

She was born in Hyde Park, New York and graduated from Westfield High School in Westfield, New Jersey. She attended the Conservatory of Music in New York City and New Jersey State Teachers College. She was elected to the New Jersey General Assembly in 1941, and was re-elected in 1942 and 1943. She served as Chair of the Assembly Institutions and Agencies Committee. She lived in Maplewood, New Jersey with her husband, Charles Douglas MacCarthy, and their son, Alan Wallace MacCarthy.
