= Art Institute of Colorado =

Former for-profit art school

The Art Institute of Colorado
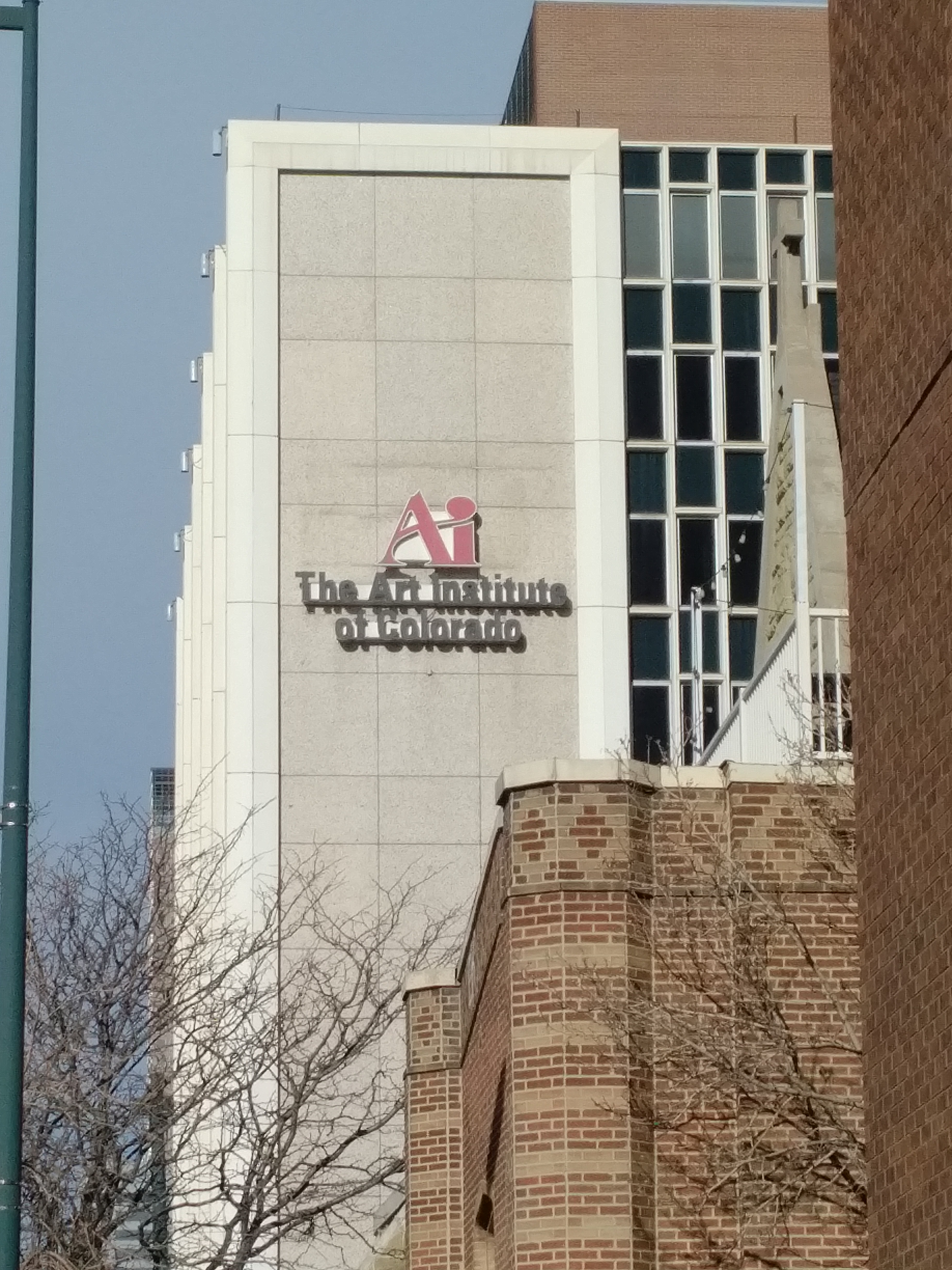
- The Art Institute of Colorado, viewed from Lincoln Street
- Former name: Colorado Institute of Art (CIA)
- Type: For-profit
- Active: 1952–2018
- Affiliations: Dream Center Education Holdings (DCEH), LLC
- President: James Caldwell
- Faculty: 140
- Administrative staff: 85
- Location: Denver, Colorado, United States; 39°44′08″N 104°59′09″W
- Website: https://www.artinstitutes.edu/denver

The Art Institute of Colorado was a for-profit art and culinary school in Denver, Colorado, United States. It briefly operated as a non-profit institution before it closed in 2018. The school was one of a number of Art Institutes, a franchise of for-profit art colleges with many branches in North America, owned and operated by Education Management Corporation. EDMC owned the college from 1975 until 2017, when, facing significant financial problems and declining enrollment, the company sold the Art Institute of Colorado, along with 30 other Art Institute schools, to Dream Center Education, a Los Angeles–based Pentecostal organization. Dream Center permanently closed 18 Art Institute schools, including the Art Institute of Colorado, at the end of 2018.

== History ==
The school was established in 1952 and founded as a private college for arts and crafts. In 1956 John Jellico, a former Assistant Director of the Art Institute of Pittsburgh, joined the staff and introduced the Commercial Arts program. In 1960, he took over management of the school.

In 1975, Education Management Corporation (EDMC) of Pittsburgh bought out the school and became a branch of the Art Institute System of Schools. A year later Interior Design and a Photography program were added. In 1977 the school moved from 16 West 13th Avenue to 200 East 9th Avenue in Denver where the administrative office were on the first floor with photography labs located in the basement level. The campus included the building at 300 E. 9th Ave which housed classrooms including the Industrial Design labs. A building south of 300 E. 9th, 838 N. Grant St., housed additional computer labs for graphic design and 3D animation.

A short-lived program was the Music and Video Business program. It was started in 1987, and the first graduating class was in 1989. Some of the campuses later continued to offer a video production program. In 2013, the Web Design & Interactive Media and Graphic Design programs at both the Associates and Bachelors level were merged into the Graphic & Web Design program.

A Culinary Arts program was started in 1993 at a satellite campus in the Denver Design District at 675 S. Broadway. The Broadway location had four labs for production of hot and cold foods, one baking and pastry lab, one multipurpose lab, and one computer lab, along with the student-run Assignments Restaurant. In 2000, the school moved its main campus to 1200 Lincoln St., keeping the old location as another satellite building, primarily devoted to the Industrial Design department. In 2012, they vacated the building on 9th Avenue, and all programs other than Culinary became hosted at the 1200 Lincoln location, which housed 26 classrooms; fifteen computer labs; a library; photography studios; digital video, animation, sound and editing studios; and the John Jellico Gallery in the Golden Triangle District in Downtown Denver. A long-term arrangement for student housing was made at 5785 E. 8th Ave. All three buildings were used until the school closed.

Although the school's official name became "The Art Institute of Colorado (AiC)", it was sometimes referred to as the "Colorado Institute of Art (CIA)".

On June 27, 2013, the Art Institute of Colorado was placed on notice by its regional accreditor, the Higher Learning Commission (HLC) of the North Central Association of Colleges and Schools. The commission cited concerns related to student success, including retention and attrition, institutional review of data related to student success, faculty workload and development, enrollment management, and evidence-based planning. The institute's accreditation was renewed in 2015 following a focused visit and subsequent report.

In 2017, Education Management Corporation sold the school to Dream Center Education Holdings, LLC. The school stopped enrolling students in 2017, and closed in 2018 after losing accreditation.

=== Presidents ===
- John T. Barclay, 1976–1980
- Cheryl Murphy, 1980–1991
- W.C. "Bill" Bottoms, 1991–1996
- David C. Zorn, 1996–2014

== Notable alumni ==
- John Cuneo – illustrator
- Cody Donovan (media arts) – mixed martial artist
- Trevor Wittman – boxing and MMA trainer.

== Notable faculty ==
- Don Dexter, PhD. (video production, digital film) – current 2014 Regional Emmy Award winner - short form fiction, short form non-fiction
- Ed Kramer (Media Arts and Animation, Visual Effects and Motion Graphics) – Senior Technical Director and Sequence Supervisor at Industrial Light + Magic (1994–2006)
