= Griswold Home Care =

American home care company

Griswold Home Care is a Pennsylvania-based home care company.

== History ==
The company was founded by Jean Griswold in 1982. The fledgling corporation's first name was Overnight Sitting Service. The company was renamed Special Care Inc., then renamed Griswold Home Care.

According to Inc. (magazine), by 1989 the company was a $10-million, multi-state business. In 2002, while still known as Special Care, the company had 5 offices in the Philadelphia area run out of the corporate offices, with offices elsewhere operated as franchises. Revenues were $80 million. On the 20th anniversary of its founding, April 26, 2002, the company name officially changed to Griswold Home Care.

In 2005, it was described by the Philadelphia Business Journal as "the nation's largest, privately owned non-medical home-care company." In 2009 it had 103 franchises. As of 2026, the company operates in 32 states.

In 2012, Pouschine Cook Capital Management purchased Griswold Home Care.

In 1995, the company drew negative attention when one of its home care employees was arrested while buying illegal drugs, and press reports focused on the fact that since the company does not provide medical services, its employees are not required to be certified and may not be closely supervised.

Griswold was among the corporations that pushed for better government oversight of the home care industry.

== Management ==
Griswold hired Ray Uhlhorn as chief operating officer in 2002.
