= Devin Caherly =

American social media personality (born 2001)

- Born: Devin Caherly
- Occupations: Influencer; TikToker
- Years active: 2019–present

TikTok information
- Page: devincaherly
- Followers: 10.6M

YouTube information
- Subscribers: 5.59 million
- Views: 5.8 billion
- Last updated: 25 July 2025

Devin Caherly is an American social media personality most known for his content on TikTok.

== Early life and education ==
Devin Caherly graduated from Westfield High School in 2019 and attends University of Arizona where he is majoring in entrepreneurship.

== Online presence ==
Caherly is known for his POV TikTok posts. In May 2020, Caherly's wedding meme went viral.He does duets with TikToker Tatayanna Mitchell. In December 2020, by stating the name Charli D'Amelio 100,000 times, Caherly's post generated over a million views.
