= Dana Harrison =

American business professional

Dana Harrison (November 19, 1960 – March 9, 2018) was an American business professional, arts community and non-profit organizer, producer, director and entrepreneur.

Born Dana Lynn Harrison on November 19, 1960, in Bryn Mawr, Pennsylvania, she spent her childhood in Westfield, New Jersey. She graduated from Westfield High School in 1977 at age 16 and at age 20 obtained a degree in history from Princeton University, where she also served as the President of Terrace Club. Having moved to the Bay Area of northern California after college, she initially pursued a career in finance that included launching early online trading and brokerage services for Charles Schwab.

However, in 1998, citing an incident in which she was injured by a driver running a red light as a wake-up call, she changed her focus to align with her long interest in creative pursuits and joined the staff of the Burning Man festival. Nicknamed "Biz Babe" by the Burning Man community, she established the first ticketing system for the event, and later expanded her responsibilities to other financial and administrative matters, including the creation and running of Black Rock City, LLC, the business entity that organizes the festival each year. She remained an advisory board member of the related Black Rock Arts Foundation for most of her life, and was featured in the 2005 documentary film Burning Man: Beyond Black Rock.

in 1999, she helped to found Planet Care, a non-profit performing humanitarian work in Burma, and served as its executive director until the organization's merger with the Global Health Access Project (GHAP). That same year, she purchased a former industrial building in Oakland, California which had been illegally converted to residential use, and began transforming it into The Noodle Factory, intended to become an affordable arts and performance space. Having originally anticipated that her Burning Man colleagues would help to support and develop the project, Harrison ended up shouldering the significant financial and renovations burden alone. In order to keep the project afloat, she rented the space to a variety of tenants including event organizers, and by 2003 it had become a popular venue for raves. Unable to overcome the monetary and logistical difficulties of the site, she finally arranged to pass ownership of the building to the non-profit Northern California Land Trust in 2005.

Harrison formed Post-Playa Productions in 2005 in order to stage the Burning Man-inspired rock opera How To Survive The Apocalypse: A Burning Opera, based on a libretto by Erik Davis and composer Mark Nichols and directed by Christopher Fuelling. Late in her life, she spent four years as managing director and community liaison for Theater Bay Area, a service organization for performing arts companies, and from 2015 she served as a director of the Ridhwan Foundation, a spiritual organization promoting the teachings of A. H. Almaas.

== Death ==
Harrison died on March 9, 2018, in Berkeley, California of an uncommon fast-developing form of cancer.
