= Higher Learning Commission =

U.S. university accreditation organization

- Predecessor: North Central Association of Colleges and Schools
- Formation: 1895
- Purpose: Higher education accreditation
- Headquarters: Chicago, Illinois
- Region served: United States
- Main organ: Board of Directors
- Affiliations: CHEA
- Website: hlcommission.org

The Higher Learning Commission (HLC) is an institutional accreditor in the United States. It has historically accredited post-secondary education institutions in the central United States: Arizona, Arkansas, Colorado, Illinois, Indiana, Iowa, Kansas, Michigan, Minnesota, Missouri, Nebraska, New Mexico, North Dakota, Ohio, Oklahoma, South Dakota, West Virginia, Wisconsin, and Wyoming. The headquarters of the organization is in Chicago, Illinois.

The United States Department of Education and the Council for Higher Education Accreditation recognize the commission as an institutional accreditor. HLC grew out of the higher education division of the North Central Association of Colleges and Schools (NCA), which dissolved in 2014.

== Criteria for accreditation ==
The Higher Learning Commission has five major criteria for accreditation. They are: (1) Mission, (2) Ethics, (3) Teaching and Learning: Quality, Resources, and Support, (4) Teaching and Learning: Evaluation and Improvement, and (5) Resources, Planning, and Institutional Effectiveness.

== Criticism ==
In 2009, the Office of the Inspector General of the U.S. Department of Education (OIG-ED) criticized the Higher Learning Commission's oversight of for-profit colleges and recommended that the agency consider "limiting, suspending, or terminating the organization's status." Although the OIG reaffirmed their recommendation that the department consider sanctions for the HLC the following year, adding critical reviews of HLC's accreditation of American InterContinental University and The Art Institute of Colorado, the Department of Education did not withdraw or limit HLC's accreditation authority. Six years later in 2015, the OIG-ED again criticized HLC, this time with an audit on the review process the HLC used while considering colleges' proposals for competency-based credentials.

== Academic Quality Improvement Program ==
The Academic Quality Improvement Program is a set of policies and procedures that institutions can follow in order to maintain accreditation by the HLC.

=== History ===
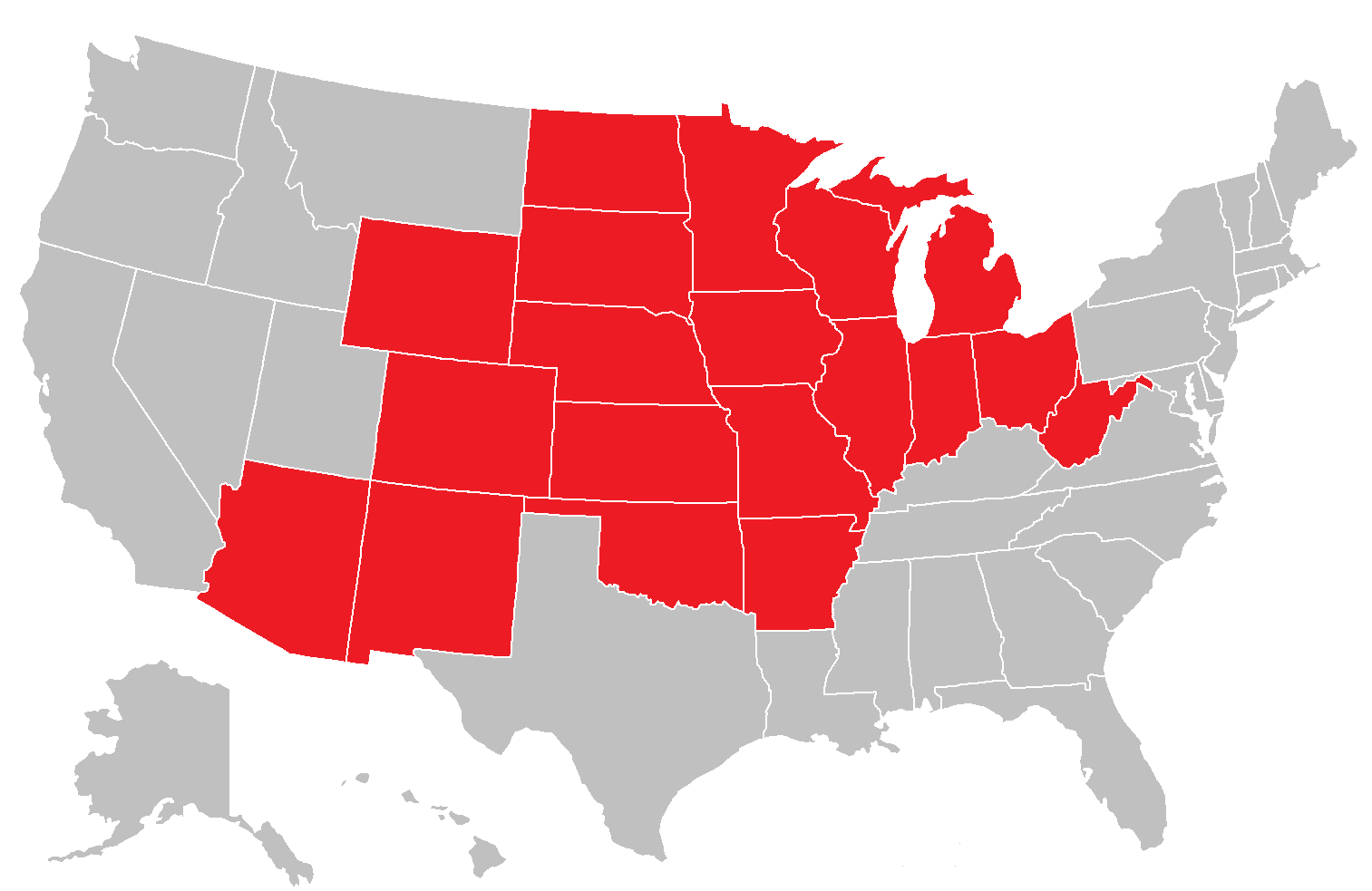
Former regional accreditation territory

The Academic Quality Improvement Program (AQIP) was developed as the "Academic Quality Improvement Project" beginning in 1999 by Stephen Spangehl at the Higher Learning Commission (HLC) (then the North Central Association of Colleges and Schools). The project was funded by a grant from the Pew Charitable Trusts. The project was inspired by Spangehl's experience as an examiner for the Malcolm Baldrige National Quality Award, and sought to apply the principles of Total quality management to higher education.

AQIP originally focused on 9 categories of activity that lent themselves to self-assessment and continuous improvement, improved and refined in 2008. The guidelines identified ten core principles—Focus, Involvement, Leadership, Learning, People, Collaboration, Agility, Foresight, Information, and Integrity—that high performing organizations use to guide their operations, and required institutions to develop their own projects to apply those principles tho their own activity and measure their success.

The program took a collaborative approach with "Strategy Forums" where groups of institutions shared their insights about the "Action Projects" they undertook to address various challenges. The records of Action Projects were stored in an online network that other participants could access and use as guidance for future improvements. At the end of the review cycle institutions were responsible for preparing a "Systems Portfolio" that required them to answer specific question about processes, results, and improvements for each of the 9 AQIP categories.

=== Modern Form ===
Known as the "AQIP Pathway", AQIP was one of three options (including Standard and Open Pathways) that institutions accredited by the Higher Learning Commission were able to pursue for reaccreditation. Linnea Stenson served as director of the program from 2015 to 2021.

In order to elect participation in AQIP, institutions were required to be accredited for ten years and to have demonstrated established foundations in "expected practice" under traditional pathways. Numerous factors might have made an institution ineligible for the optional pathway, including recent change in control, substantive change, sanction, monitoring, or if the accreditor had serious concerns about the institution's conduct or commitment to required accreditation activities.

At the end of academic year 2019–2020, HLC officially phased out AQIP as an accreditation pathway, leaving only Standard and Open Pathways as re-accreditation options.

== See also ==
- Universities and colleges accredited by the Higher Learning Commission
- List of recognized higher education accreditation organizations
- AdvancED (accrediting agency for primary and secondary schools that evolved from the NCA).
