= Who Is Rich? =

2017 novel by Matthew Klam

- First edition
- Author: Matthew Klam
- Language: English
- Publisher: Random House
- Publication date: 2017
- Publication place: United States
- Media type: Print (hardback & paperback)
- ISBN: 978-0-8129-9798-9

Who is Rich? is a 2017 novel by American author Matthew Klam. It is his first novel, and his first published book since his 2001 short story collection Sam the Cat and Other Stories.
