= Matthew Klam =

American writer

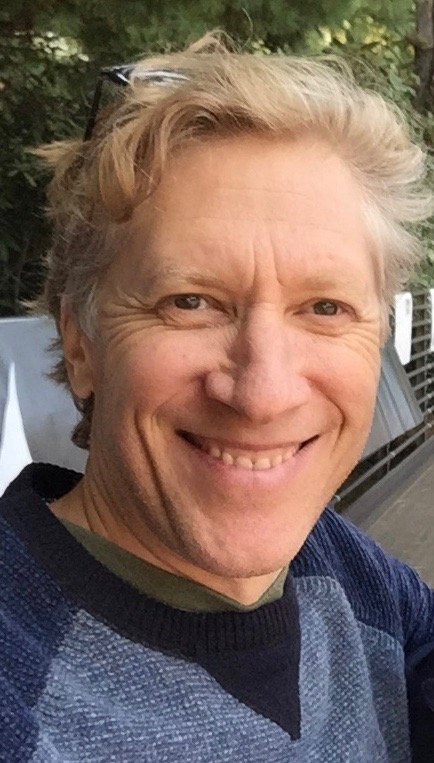
- Matthew Klam, author
- Born: 1964 (age 61–62)
- Occupations: Novelist, short story writer
- Website: matthewklam.com

Matthew Klam (born 1964) is an American fiction writer and magazine journalist.

== Early life ==
Matthew Klam graduated from the University of New Hampshire, where he studied Philosophy, and he later received an MA from Hollins College. In 1999 The New Yorker named him one of the 25 best fiction writers under 40.

== Career ==
=== Short stories and essays ===
In 2000 he published his first book, a collection of short stories entitled Sam the Cat and Other Stories. Publishers Weekly wrote of the work that, "Throughout the collection, Klam demonstrates his mastery of the fine art of irony, exposing the nerve endings of his complex, often tormented, sometimes funny, characters, while allowing the reader to make his or her own judgments." The New York Times called the work a "smart, absorbing collection". The book received the PEN/Robert Bingham Prize.

Following its publication, Klam's work has appeared in a variety of publications, including The Wall Street Journal, Vulture, The New Yorker, Esquire, GQ, Harper's, and The New York Times Magazine.

=== Teaching ===
Between 2009 and 2017 he took a hiatus from publishing in order to assume a tenure-track professorship at Johns Hopkins University in the creative writing department. Fellow Johns Hopkins professor Alice McDermott noted that Klam's work at the university showed a "tremendous enthusiasm" as she commented on the "energy he brings to his reading: to the work of his students, but also to the published work of his contemporaries." He remained at Johns Hopkins until 2016. He has also taught at American University, the University of Michigan, Stockholm University, and St. Albans School. In 2023 he was a Visiting Associate Professor at Stony Brook Southampton in the Creative Writing and Literature Department.

=== First novel ===
In 2017 he published his second book, a novel entitled Who is Rich?. Vulture said of the work that it was "very funny, very frank, and often shocking book … a book-long meditation on the nature of a marriage under the stress of children and financial pressures." The book was named to the Notable Books list of The New York Times and the Washington Post, as well as a Book of the Year by Vogue magazine. The New York Times called his writing in Who is Rich?, "Funny, maddening and defiantly original", noting that Klam was "gifted at discussing complicated themes." The New Yorker said it was "a gem within the canon of infidelity literature." The Washington Post said of the work that it was, "an irresistible comic novel that pumps blood back into the anemic tales of middle-aged white guys." The book was nominated for the Center for Fiction First Novel Prize.

== Recognition ==
In 2008 Klam was the recipient of a Guggenheim fellowship for fiction writing. He has also been a recipient of a grant from the National Endowment of the Arts, a Whiting Award and an O. Henry Award.

== Personal life ==
Klam lives in Washington, D.C. He serves on the Advisory Board of the Writers Studio in NYC.

== Selected bibliography ==
=== Books ===
- Sam the Cat and Other Stories (2001)
- Who Is Rich? (2017)

=== Stories and articles ===
- "European Wedding" (May 1, 2000, The New Yorker)
- "Experiencing Ecstasy" (January 21, 2001, The New York Times Magazine)
- "Fear and Laptops on the Campaign Trail" (September 26, 2004, The New York Times Magazine)
- "Adina, Astrid, Chipewee, Jasmine" (May 15, 2006, The New Yorker)
- "The Other Party" (December 19, 2022, The New Yorker)
- "Henry Winkler Breaks the Curse of Stardom" (April 27, 2022, The New York Times Magazine)
- "Hi Daddy" (October 14, 2024, The New Yorker)
