= Bhutanese art =

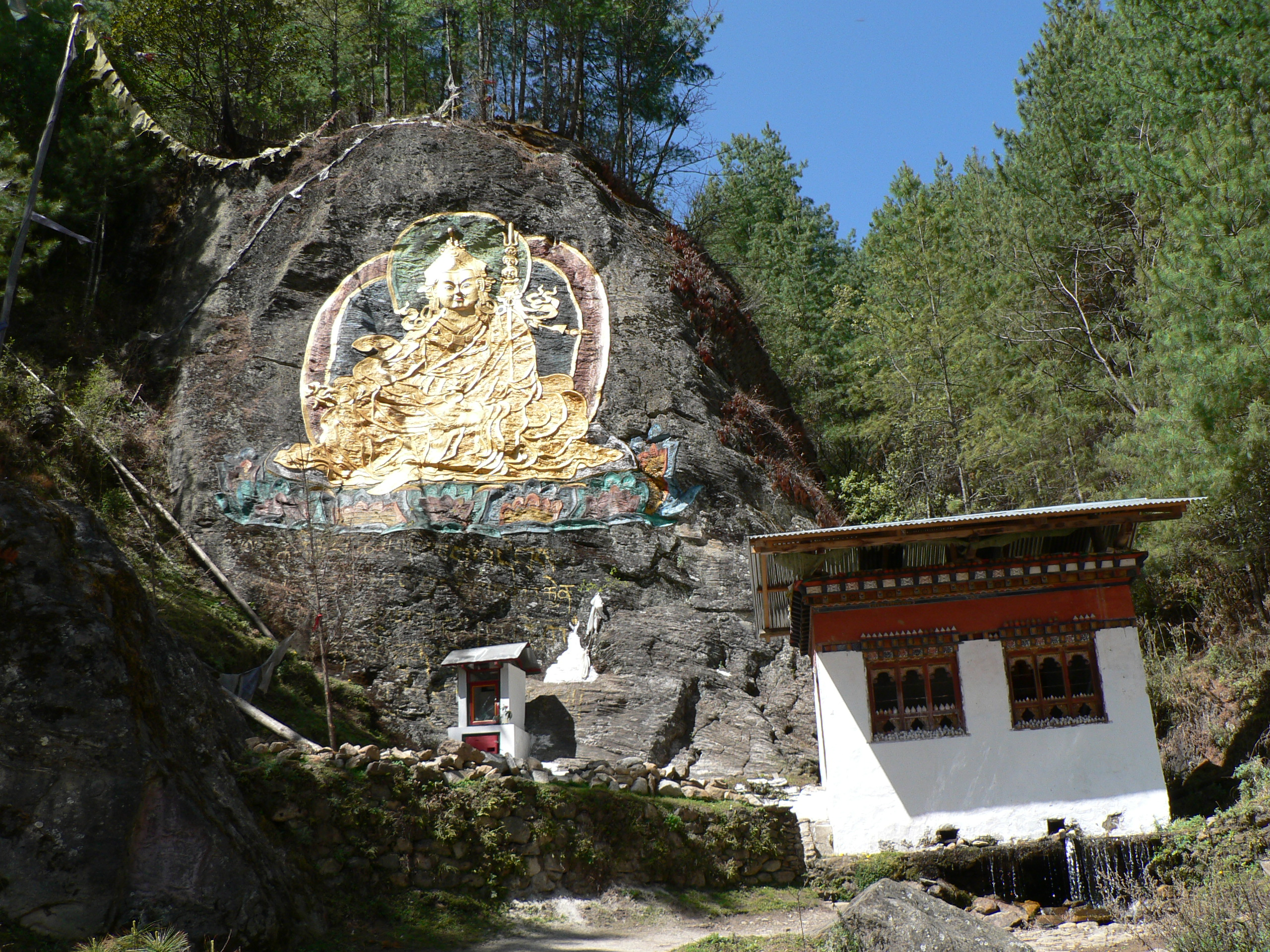
Rock picture of Padmasambhava north of Thimphu

Bhutanese art (Dzongkha: འབྲུག་པའི་སྒྱུ་རྩལ) is similar to Tibetan art. Both are based upon Vajrayana Buddhism and its pantheon of teachers and divine beings.

The major orders of Buddhism in Bhutan are the Drukpa Lineage and the Nyingma. The former is a branch of the Kagyu school and is known for paintings documenting the lineage of Buddhist masters and the 70 Je Khenpo (leaders of the Bhutanese monastic establishment). The Nyingma school is known for images of Padmasambhava ("Guru Rinpoche"), who is credited with introducing Buddhism into Bhutan in the 7th century. According to legend, Padmasambhava hid sacred treasures for future Buddhist masters, especially Pema Lingpa, to find. Tertöns are also frequent subjects of Nyingma art.

Each divine being is assigned special shapes, colors, and/or identifying objects, such as lotus, conch-shell, thunderbolt, and begging bowl. All sacred images are made to exact specifications that have remained remarkably unchanged for centuries.

Bhutanese art is particularly rich in bronzes of different kinds that are collectively known by the name Kham-so (made in Kham) even though they are made in Bhutan because the technique of making them was originally imported from that region of Tibet. Wall paintings and sculptures, in these regions, are formulated on the principal ageless ideals of Buddhist art forms. Even though their emphasis on detail is derived from Tibetan models, their origins can be discerned easily, despite the profusely embroidered garments and glittering ornaments with which these figures are lavishly covered. In the grotesque world of demons, the artists apparently had a greater freedom of action than when modeling images of divine beings.

The arts and crafts of Bhutan that represent the exclusive "spirit and identity of the Himalayan kingdom" is defined as the art of Zorig Chosum, which means the “thirteen arts and crafts of Bhutan”; the thirteen crafts are carpentry, painting, paper making, blacksmithery, weaving, sculpting and many other crafts. The Institute of Zorig Chosum in Thimphu is the premier institution of traditional arts and crafts set up by the Government of Bhutan with the sole objective of preserving the rich culture and tradition of Bhutan and training students in all traditional art forms; there is another similar institution in eastern Bhutan known as Trashi Yangtse. Bhutanese rural life is also displayed in the Folk Heritage Museum in Thimphu. There is also a Voluntary Artists Studio in Thimphu to encourage and promote the art forms among the youth of Thimphu. The thirteen arts and crafts of Bhutan and the institutions established in Thimphu to promote these art forms are:

== Traditional Bhutanese arts ==
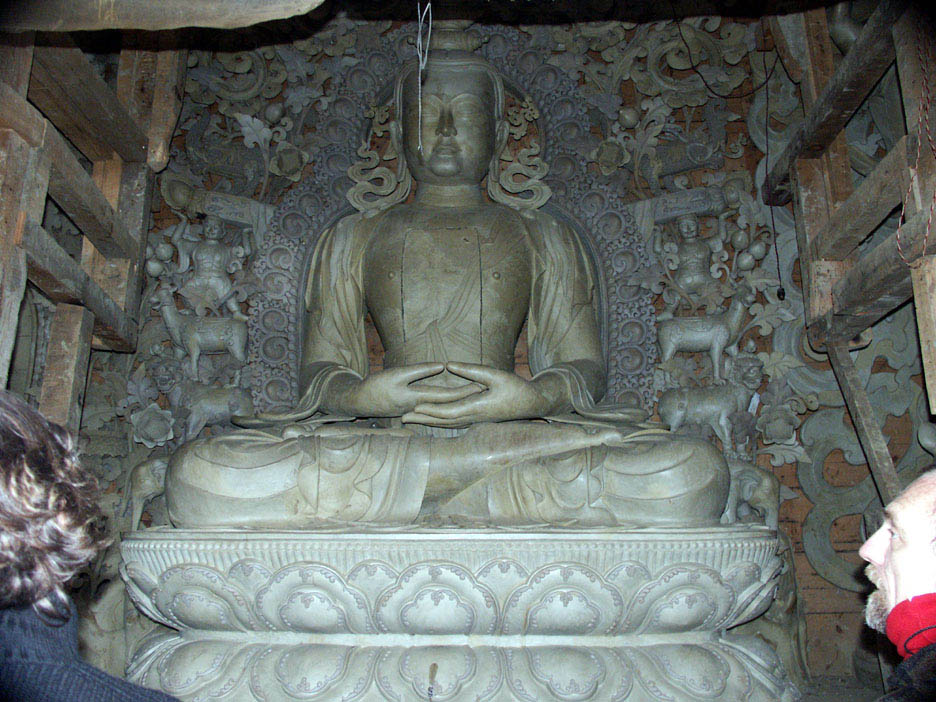
Clay statue before painting

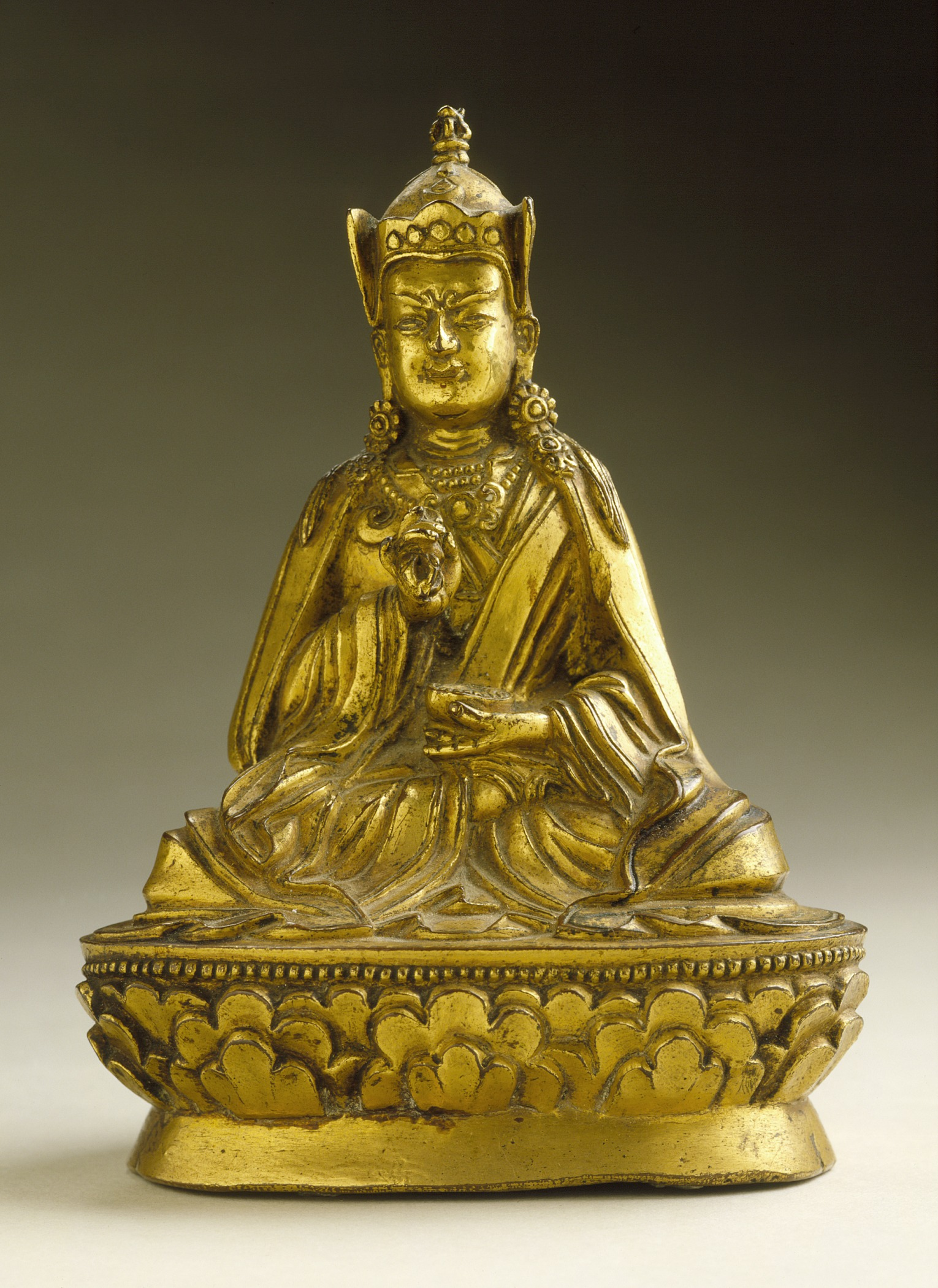
Padmasambhava or "Guru Rinpoche", 8th century

In Bhutan, the traditional arts are known as zorig chusum (zo = the ability to make; rig = science or craft; chusum = thirteen). These practices have been gradually developed through the centuries, often passed down through families with long-standing relations to a particular craft. These traditional crafts represent hundreds of years of knowledge and ability that has been passed down through generations.

The great 15th century tertön, Pema Lingpa is traditionally credited with introducing the arts into Bhutan. In 1680, Ngawang Namgyal, the Zhabdrung Rinpoche, ordered the establishment of the school for instruction in the thirteen traditional arts. Although the skills existed much earlier, it is believed that the zorig chusum was first formally categorized during the rule of Gyalse Tenzin Rabgye (1680-1694), the 4th Druk Desi (secular ruler). The thirteen traditional arts are:

- Dezo - Paper Making: Handmade paper made mainly from the Daphne plant and gum from a creeper root.
- Dozo - Stonework: Stone arts used in the construction of stone pools and the outer walls of dzongs, gompas, stupas and some other buildings.
- Garzo - Blacksmithing: The manufacture of iron goods, such as farm tools, knives, swords, and utensils.
- Jinzo - Clay arts: The making of religious statues and ritual objects, pottery and the construction of buildings using mortar, plaster, and rammed earth.
- Lhazo - Painting: From the images on thangkas, walls paintings, and statues to the decorations on furniture and window-frames.
- Lugzo - Bronze casting: Production of bronze roof-crests, statues, bells, and ritual instruments, in addition to jewelry and household items using sand casting and lost-wax casting. Larger statues are made by repoussé.
- Parzo - Wood, slate, and stone carving: In wood, slate or stone, for making such items as printing blocks for religious texts, masks, furniture, altars, and the slate images adorning many shrines and altars.
- Shagzo - Woodturning: Making a variety of bowls, plates, cups, and other containers.
- Shingzo - Woodworking: Employed in the construction of dzongs and gompas
- Thagzo - Weaving: The production of some of the most intricately woven fabrics produced in Asia.
- Trözo - Silver- and gold-smithing: Working in gold, silver, and copper to make jewelry, ritual objects, and utilitarian household items.
- Tshazo - Cane and bamboo work: The production of such varied items as bows and arrows, baskets, drinks containers, utensils, musical instruments, fences, and mats.
- Tshemazo – Needlework: Working with needle and thread to make clothes, boots, or the most intricate of appliqué thangkas.

== Characteristics of Bhutanese arts ==
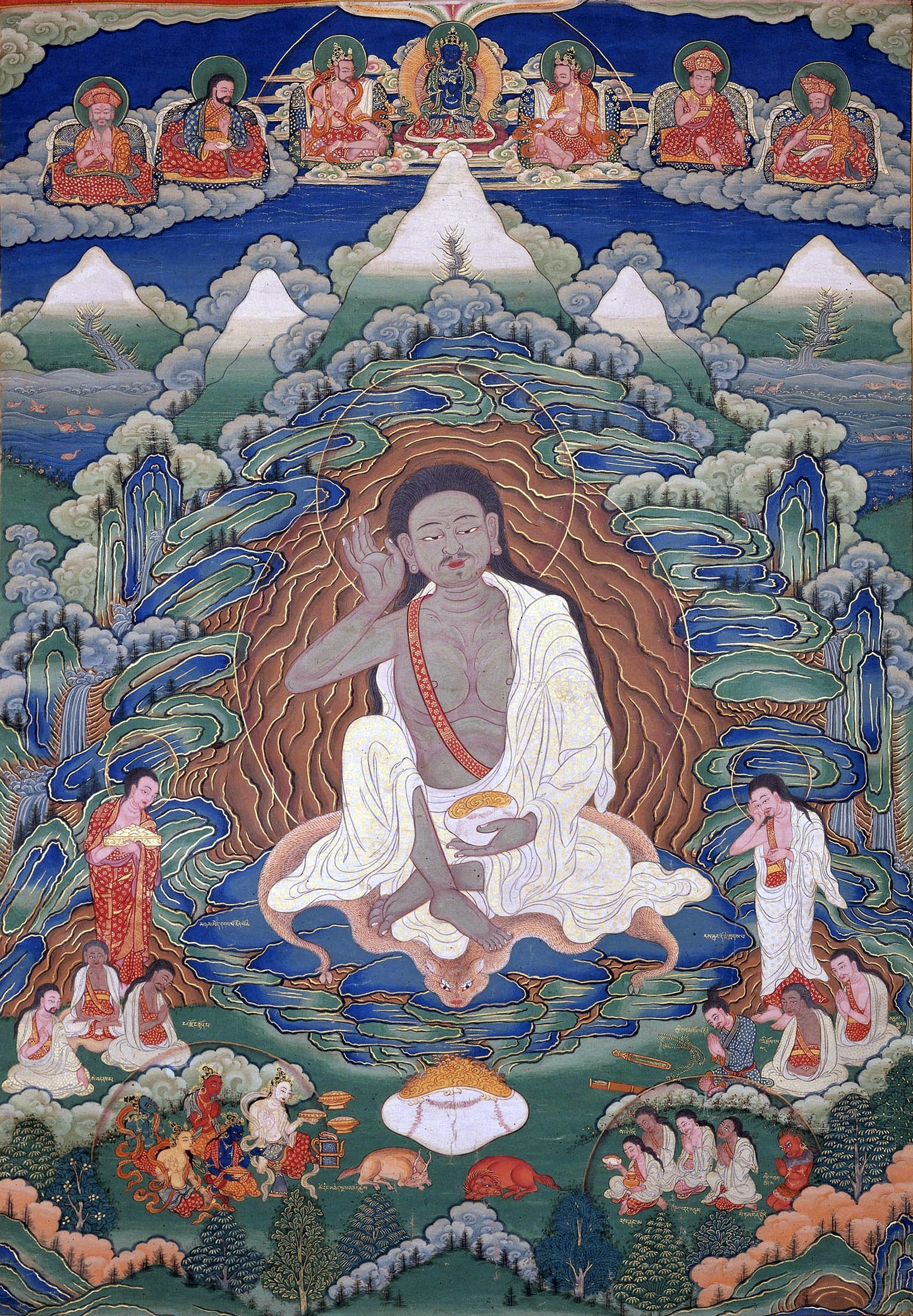
Painted thangka of Milarepa (1052-1135), late 19th-early 20th century, Dhodeydrag Gonpa, Thimphu.

Articles for everyday use are still fashioned today as they were centuries ago. Traditional artisanship is handed down from generation to generation. Bhutan's artisans are skilled workers in metals, wood and slate carving, and clay sculpture. Artifacts made of wood include bowls and dishes, some lined with silver. Elegant yet strong woven bamboo baskets, mats, hats, and quivers find both functional and decorative usage. Handmade paper is prepared from tree bark by a process passed down the ages.

Each region has its specialties: raw silk comes from eastern Bhutan, brocade from Lhuntshi (Kurtoe), woolen goods from Bumthang, bamboo wares from Kheng, woodwork from Tashi Yangtse, gold and silver work from Thimphu, and yak-hair products from the north or the Black Mountains.

Most Bhutanese art objects are produced for use of the Bhutanese themselves. Except for goldsmiths, silversmiths, and painters, artisans are peasants who produce these articles and fabrics in their spare time, with the surplus production being sold. Most products, particularly fabrics, are relatively expensive. In the highest qualities, every step of production is performed by hand, from dyeing hanks of thread or hacking down bamboo in the forest, to weaving or braiding the final product.

The time spent in producing handicrafts is considerable and can involve as much as two years for some woven textiles. At the same time, many modern innovations are also used for less expensive items, especially modern dyes, and yarns - Bhutan must be one of the few places where hand-woven polyester garments can be bought.

== Products ==
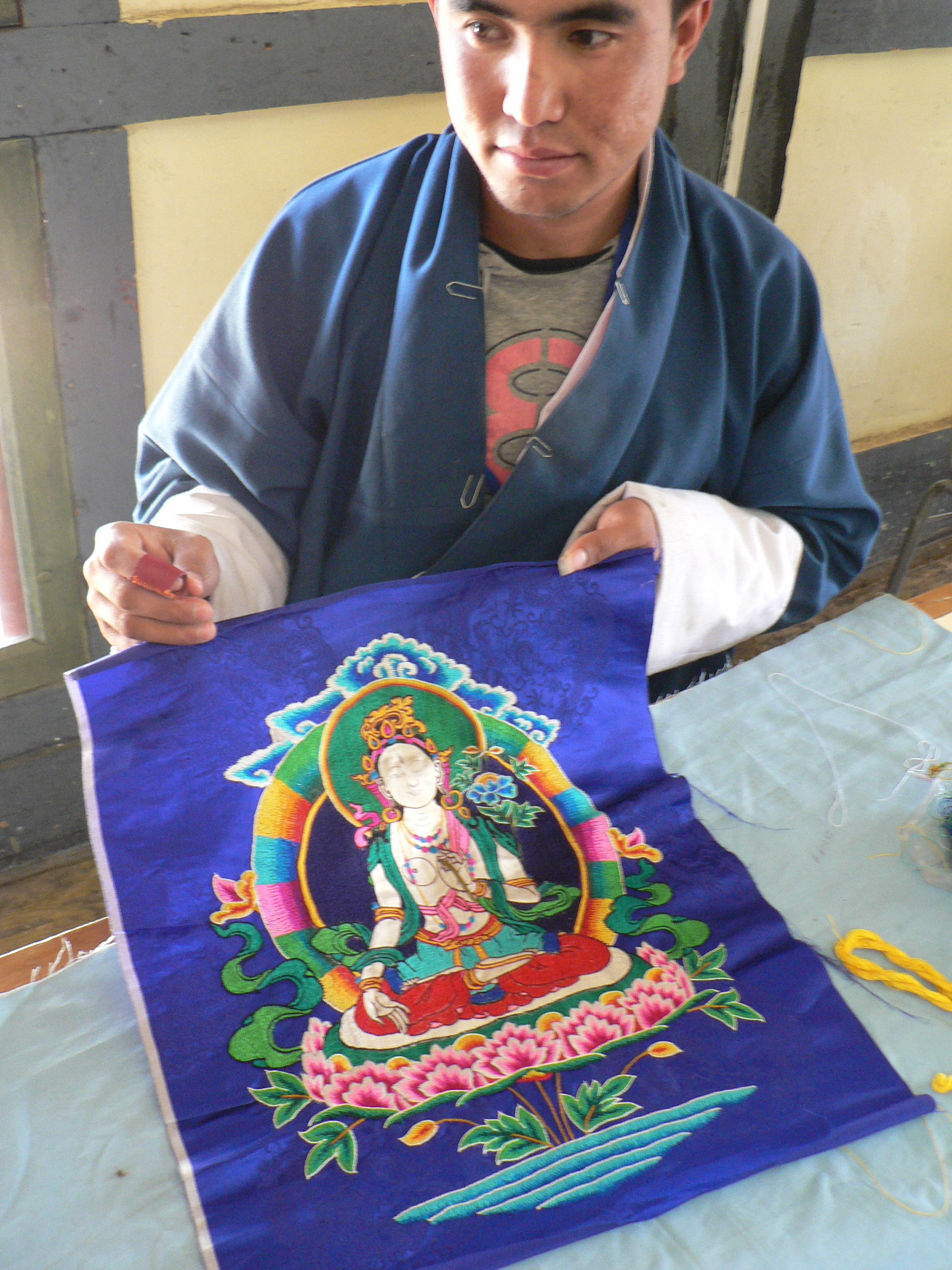
Embroidery, School of Traditional Arts.

Textiles

Bhutanese textiles are a unique art form inspired by nature made in the form of clothing, crafts and different types of pots in eye-catching blend of colour, texture, pattern and composition. This art form is witnessed all over Bhutan and in Thimphu in the daily life of its people. It is also a significant cultural exchange garment that is gifted to mark occasions of birth and death, auspicious functions such as weddings and professional achievements and in greeting dignitaries. Each region has its own special designs of textiles, either made of vegetable dyed wool known as yathra or pure silk called Kishuthara. It is the women, belonging to a small community, who weave these textiles as a household handicrafts heritage.

Paintings

Most Bhutanese art, including ‘Painting in Bhutanese art’, known as lhazo, is invariably religion centric. These are made by artists without inscribing their names on them. The paintings encompass various types including the traditional thangkas, which are scroll paintings made in “highly stylised and strict geometric proportions” of Buddhist iconography that are made with mineral paints. Most houses in Bhutan have religious and other symbolic motifs painted inside their houses and also on the external walls.

Sculptures

The art of making religious sculptures is unique in Bhutan and hence very popular in the Himalayan region. The basic material used for making the sculptures is clay, which is known as jinzob. The clay statues of Buddhist religious icons, made by well-known artists of Bhutan, embellish various monasteries in Bhutan. This art form of sculpture is taught to students by professional artists at the Institute of Zorig Chosum in Thimphu.

Paper making

Handmade paper known as deysho is in popular usage in Bhutan and it is durable and insect resistant. The basic material used is the bark of the Daphne genus of shrubs. This paper is used for printing religious texts; traditional books are printed on this paper. It is also used for packaging gifts. Apart from handmade paper, paper factories in Bhutan also produce ornamental art paper with designs of flower petals, and leaves, and other materials. For use on special occasions, vegetable dyed paper is also made.

Wood carving

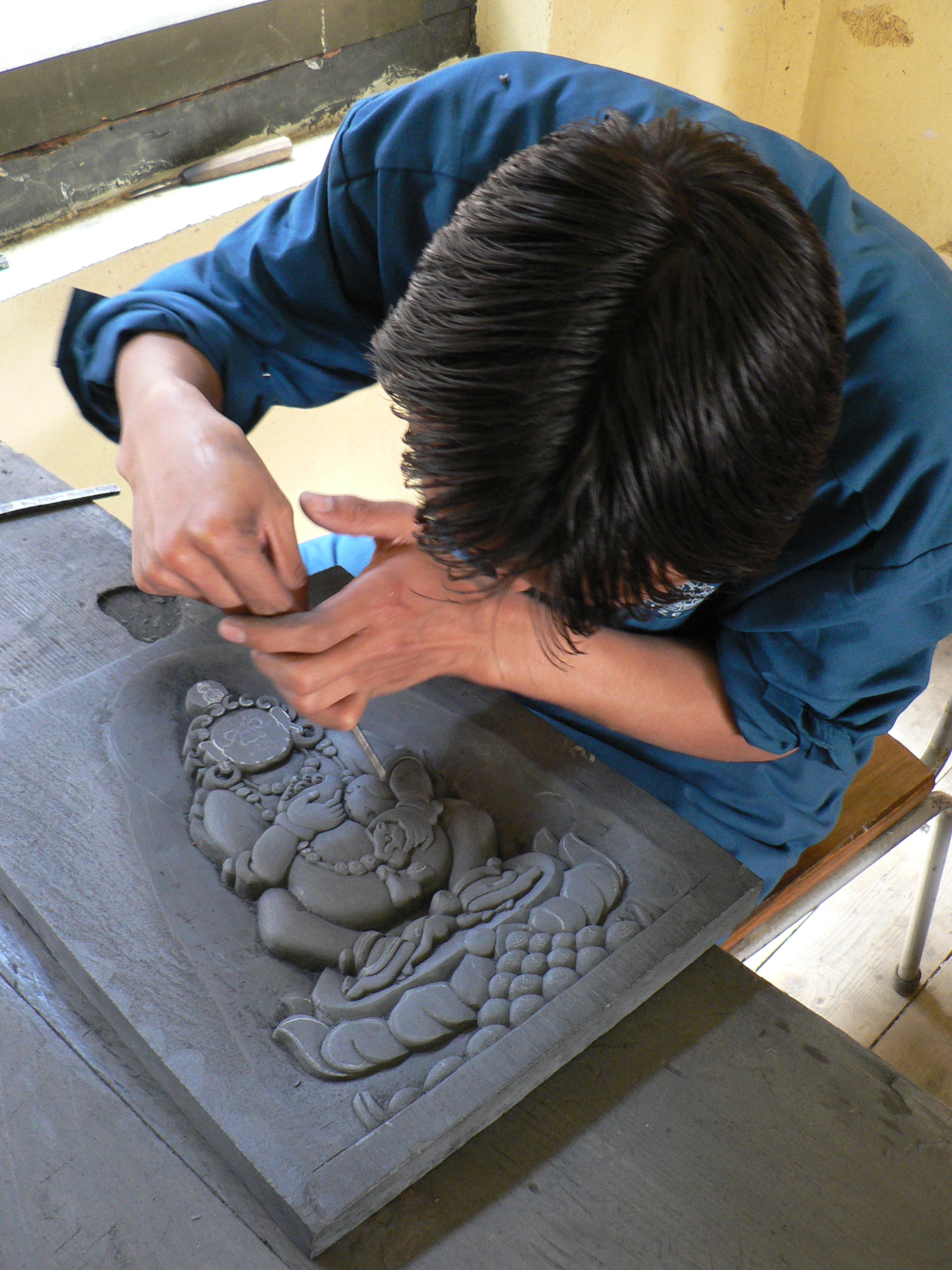
Slate carving, School of Traditional Arts.

Wood carving known as Parzo is a specialised and ancient art form, which is significantly blended with modern buildings in the resurgent Bhutan. Carved wood blocks are used for printing religious prayer flags that are seen all over Bhutan in front of monasteries, on hill ridges and other religious places. Carving is also done on slate and stone. The wood that is used for carving is seasoned for at least one year prior to carving.

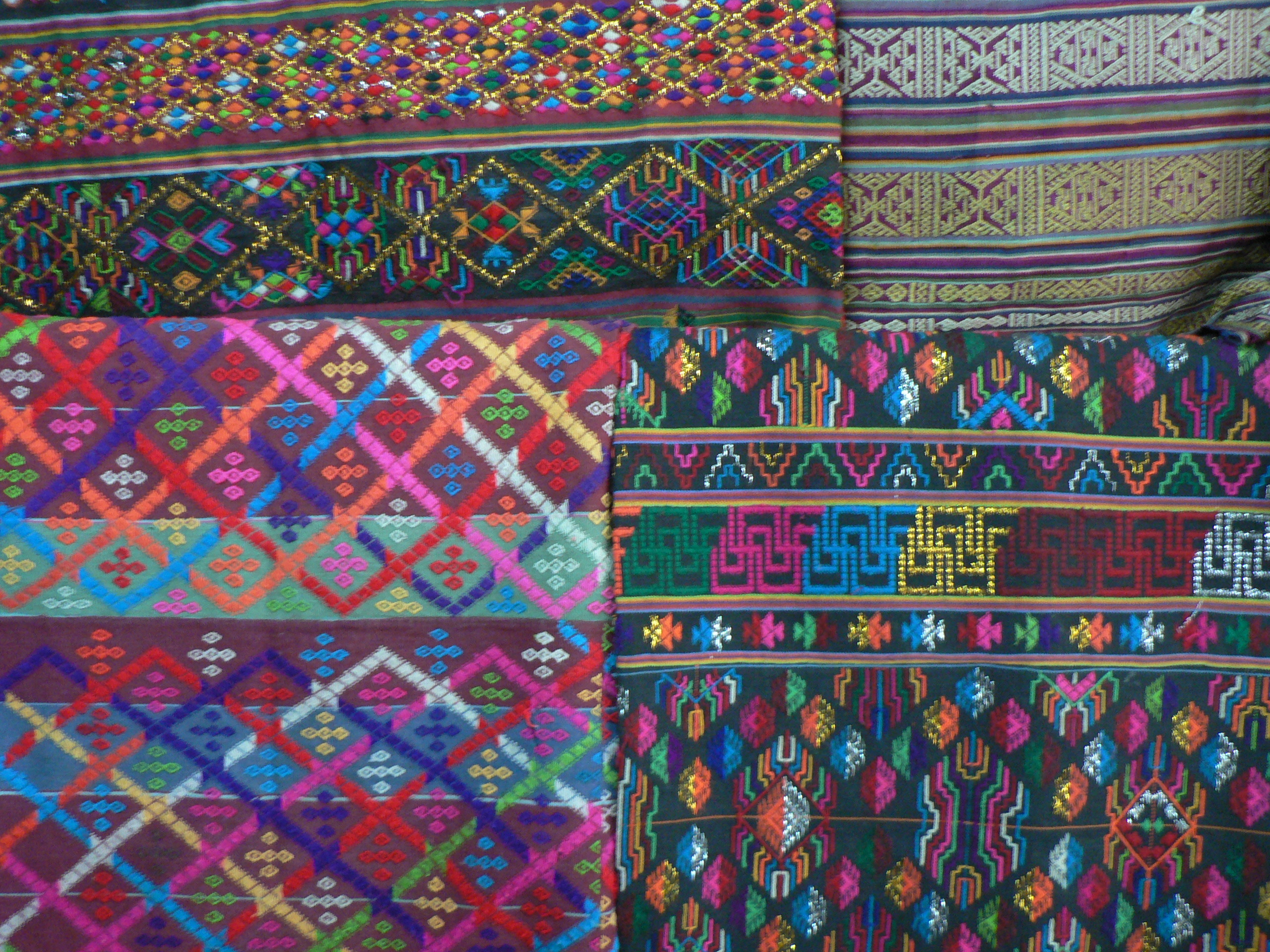
Contemporary hand-woven Bhutanese fabrics, Bumthang District

Sword making

The art of sword making falls under the tradition of garzo (or blacksmithing), an art form that is used to make all metal implements such as swords, knives, chains, darts and so forth. Ceremonial swords are made and gifted to people who are honoured for their achievements. These swords are to be sported by men on all special occasions. Children, wear a traditional short knife known as the dudzom. Terton Pema Lingpa, a religious treasure hunter from central Bhutan, was the most famous sword maker in Bhutan.

Boot Making

It is not uncommon to see Bhutan’s traditional boots made of cloth. The cloth is hand stitched, embroidered and appliquéd with Bhutanese motifs. They are worn on ceremonial occasions (mandatory); the colours used on the boot denote the rank and status of the person wearing it. In the pecking order, Ministers wear orange, senior officials wear red and the common people wear white boots. This art form has been revived at the Institute of Zorig Chosum in Thimphu. Women also wear boots but of shorter length reaching just above the ankle.

Bamboo Craft

Bamboo Craft made with cane and bamboo is known as thazo. It is made in many rural communities in many regions of Bhutan. Few special items of this art form are the belo and the bangchung, popularly known as the Bhutanese “Tupperware” basket made in various sizes. Baskets of varying sizes are used in the homes and for travel on horseback, and as flasks for local drink called the arra.

Bow and Arrow Making

To meet the growing demand for bow and arrow used in the national sport of archery, bamboo bows and arrows are made by craftsmen using specific types of bamboo and mountain reeds. The bamboo used are selected during particular seasons, shaped to size and skilfully made into the bow and arrow. Thimphu has the Changlimithang Stadium & Archery Ground where Archery is a special sport.

Jewellery

Intricate jewellery with motif, made of silver and gold, are much sought after by women of Bhutan. The traditional jewellery made in Bhutan are heavy bracelets, komas or fasteners attached to the kira, the traditional dress of Bhutanese women, loop ear rings set with turquoise and necklaces inlaid with gem stones such as antique turquoise, coral beads and the zhi stone. The zhi stone is considered a prized possession as it is said to have “protective powers”; this stone has black and white spiral designs called “eyes”. The zhi is also said to be an agate made into beads.

== Institutions ==
National Institute of Zorig Chusum

The National Institute of Zorig Chusum is the centre for Bhutanese Art education. Painting is the main theme of the institute, which provides 4–6 years of training in Bhutanese traditional art forms. The curricula cover a comprehensive course of drawing, painting, wood carving, embroidery, and carving of statues. Images of Buddha are a popular painting done here.

Handicrafts emporiums

There is a large government run emporium close to the National Institute of Zorig Chusum, which deals with exquisite handicrafts, traditional arts and jewelry; gho and kira, the national dress of Bhutanese men and women, are available in this emporium. The town has many other privately owned emporiums which deal with thangkas, paintings, masks, brassware, antique jewellery, painted lama tables known as choektse, drums, Tibetan violins and so forth; Zangma Handicrafts Emporium, in particular, sells handicrafts made in the Institute of Zorig Chusum.

Folk Heritage Museum

Folk Heritage Museum in Kawajangsa, Thimphu is built on the lines of a traditional Bhutanese farm house with more-than-100-year-old vintage furniture. It is built as a three storied structure with rammed mud walls and wooden doors, windows and roof covered with slates. It reveals much about Bhutanese rural life.

Voluntary Artists Studio

Located in a building, the Voluntary Artist Studio’s objective is to encourage traditional and contemporary art forms among the youth of Thimphu. The art works of these young artists is also available on sale in the 'Art Shop Gallery' of the studio.

National Textile Museum

The National Textile Museum in Thimphu displays various Bhutanese textiles that are extensive and rich in traditional culture. It also exhibits colourful and rare kiras and ghos (traditional Bhutanese dress, kira for women and gho for men).

== Exhibitions ==
The Honolulu Museum of Art spent several years developing and curating The Dragon’s Gift: The Sacred Arts of Bhutan exhibition. The February - May 2008 exhibition in Honolulu will travel in 2008 and 2009 to locations around the world including the Rubin Museum of Art (New York City), the Asian Art Museum (San Francisco), Guimet Museum (Paris), the Museum of East Asian Art (Cologne, Germany), and the Museum Rietberg Zürich (Switzerland).

== Selected examples of Bhutanese art ==
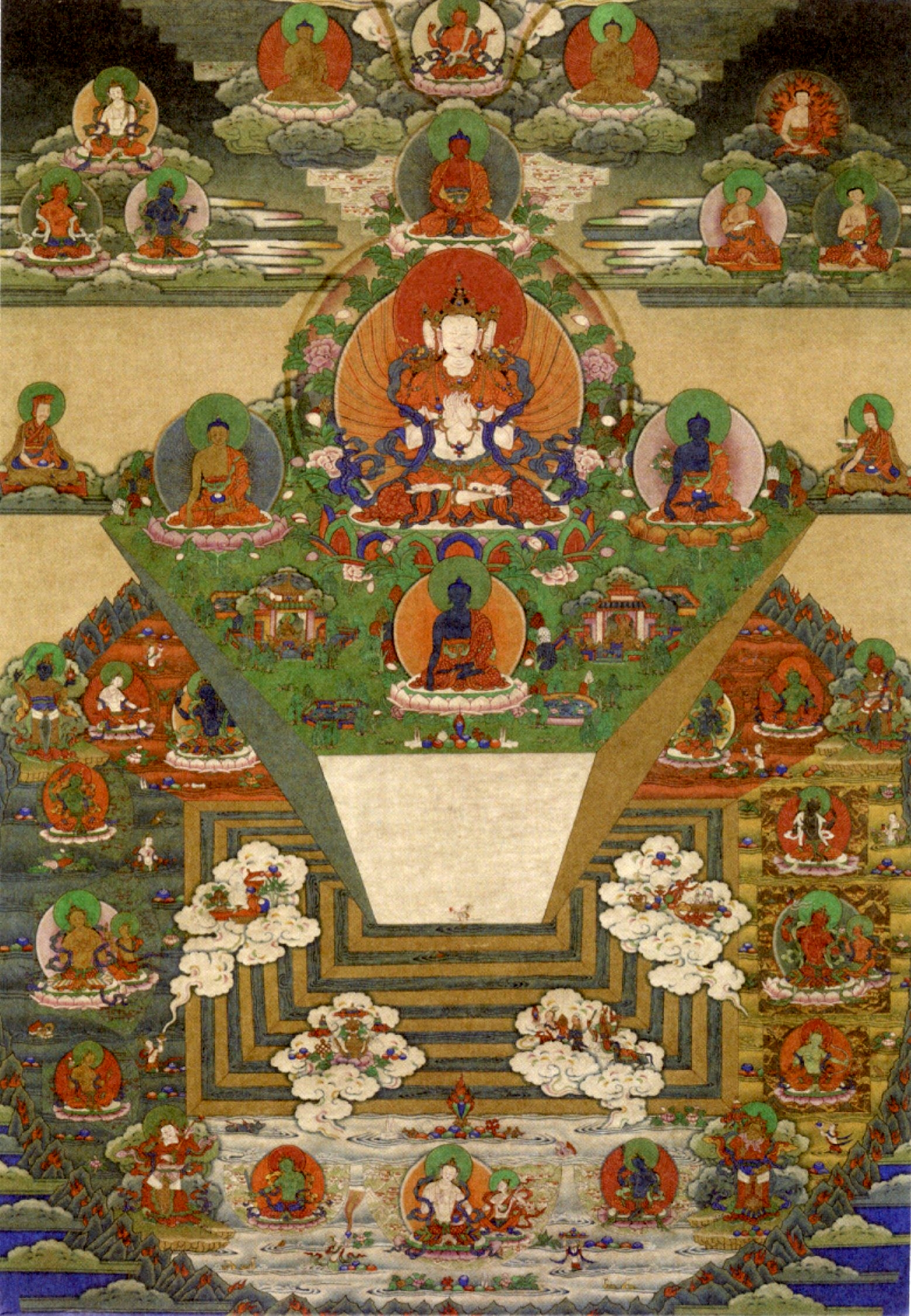
Bhutanese thangka of Mt. Meru and the Buddhist Universe, 19th century, Trongsa Dzong, Trongsa, Bhutan

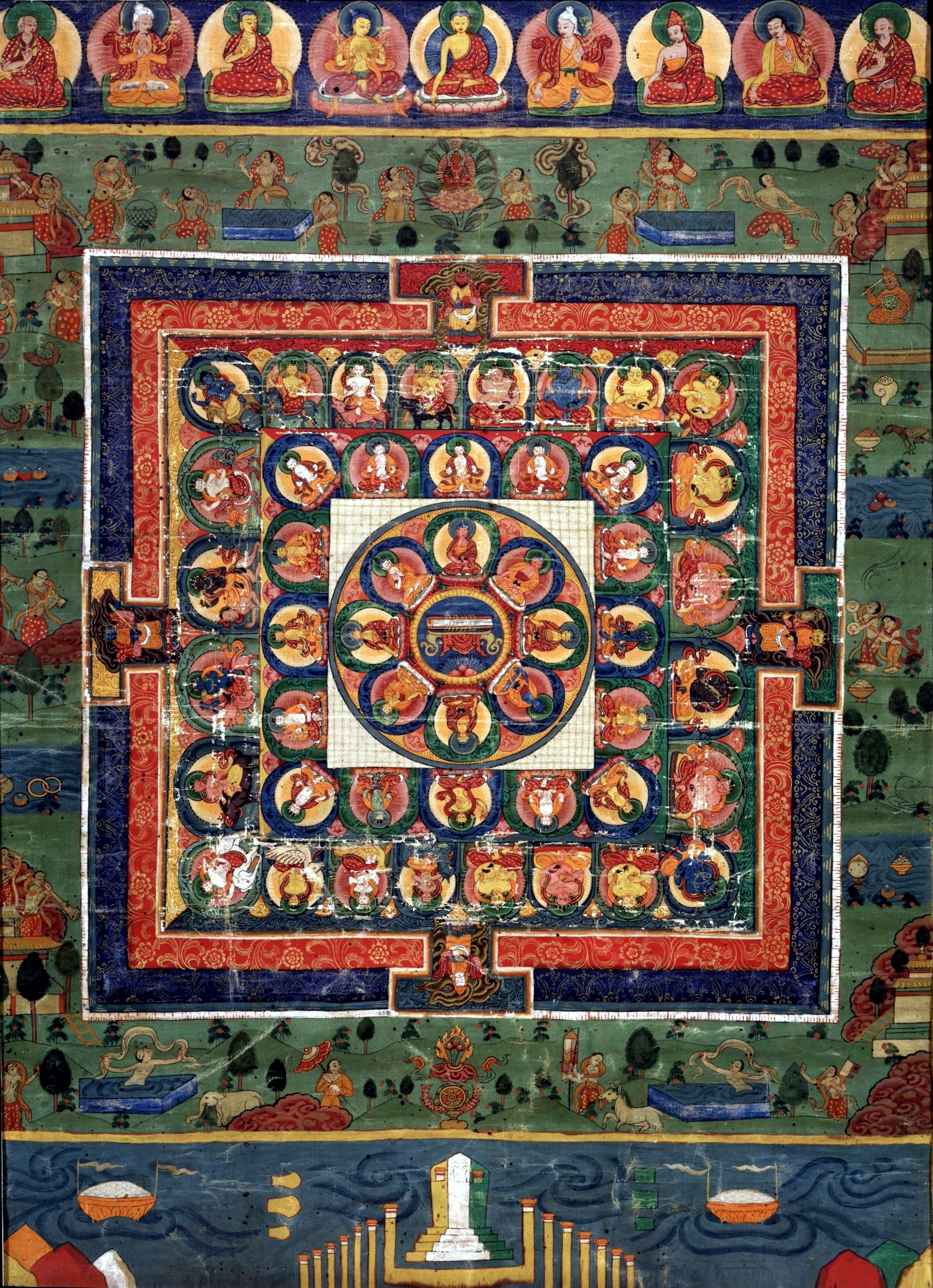
Painted Bhutanese Medicine Buddha mandala with the goddess Prajnaparamita in center, 19th century, Rubin Museum of Art

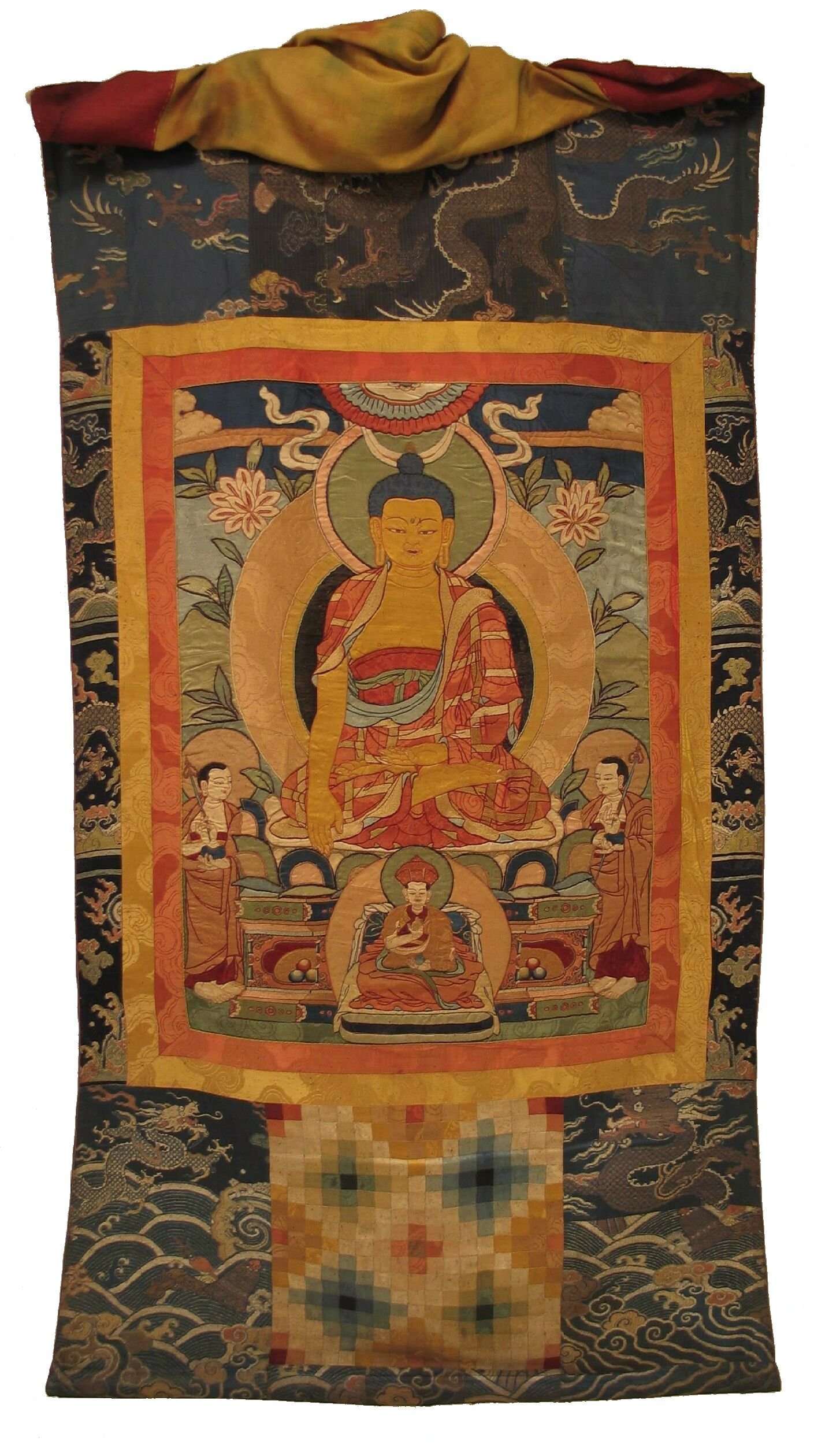
Bhutanese Drukpa appliqué Buddhist lineage thangka with Gautama Buddha in center, 19th century, Rubin Museum of Art

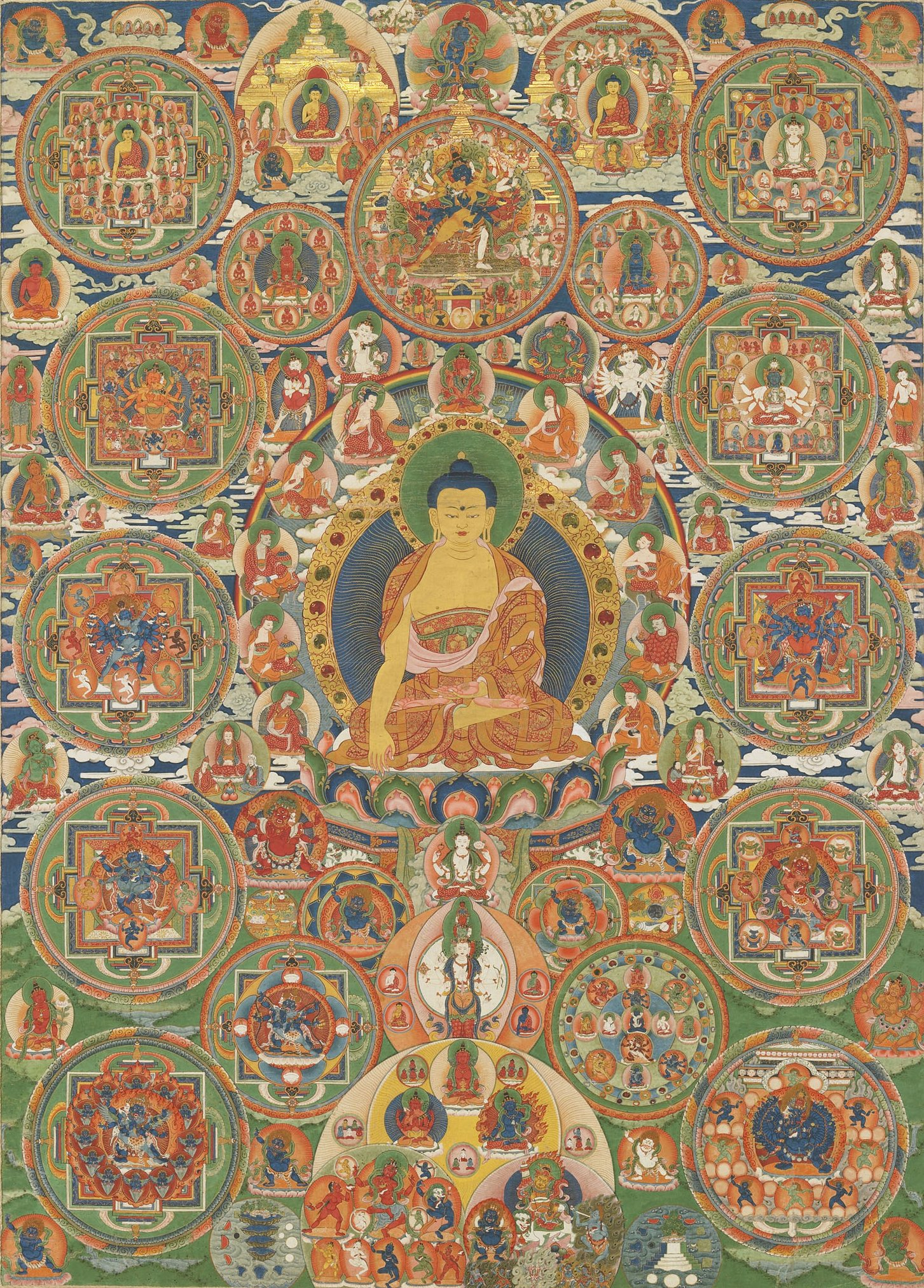
Bhutanese painted complete mandala, 19th century, Seula Gonpa, Punakha, Bhutan

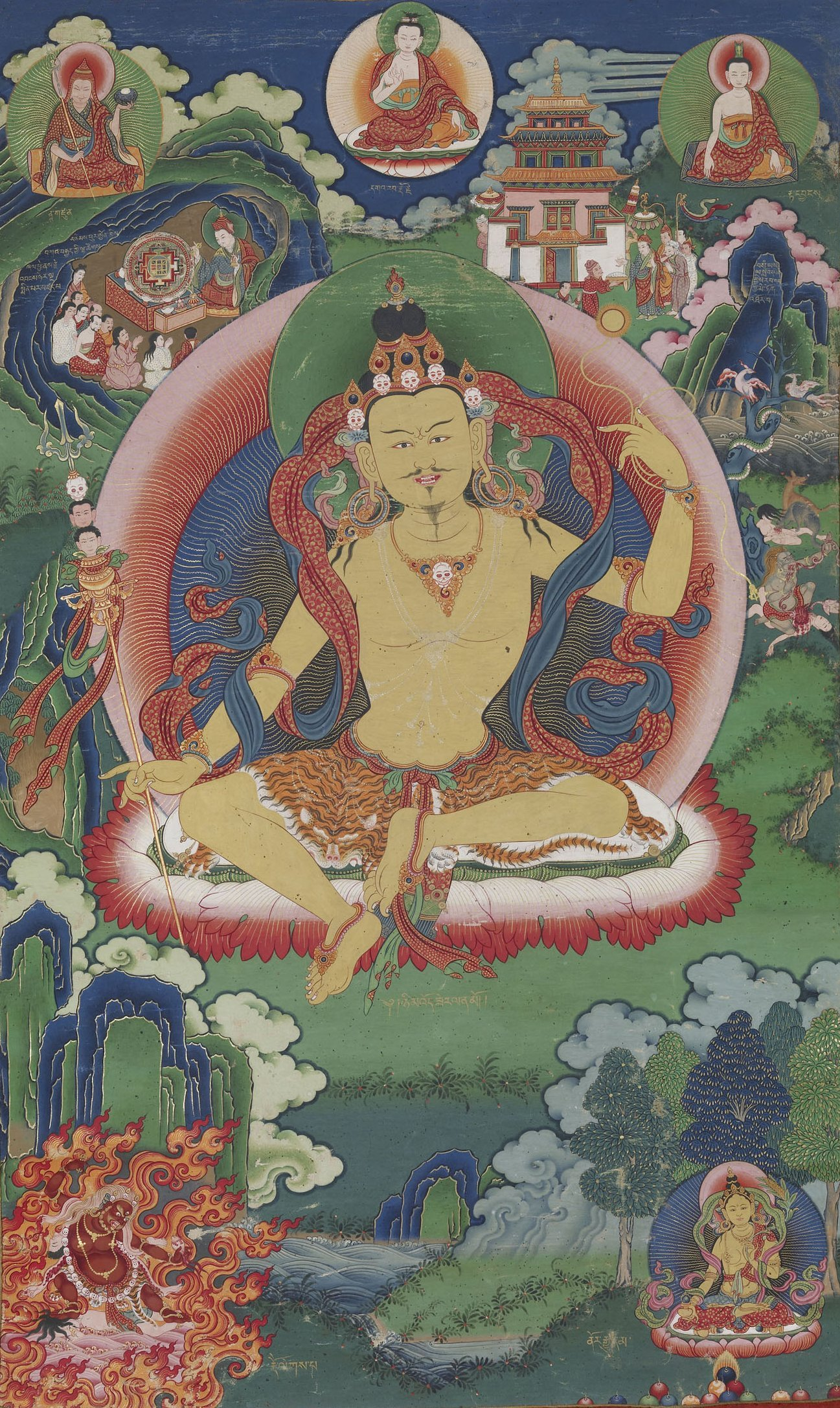
Bhutanese painted thangka of Padmasambhava, late 19th century, Do Khachu Gonpa, Chukha, Bhutan

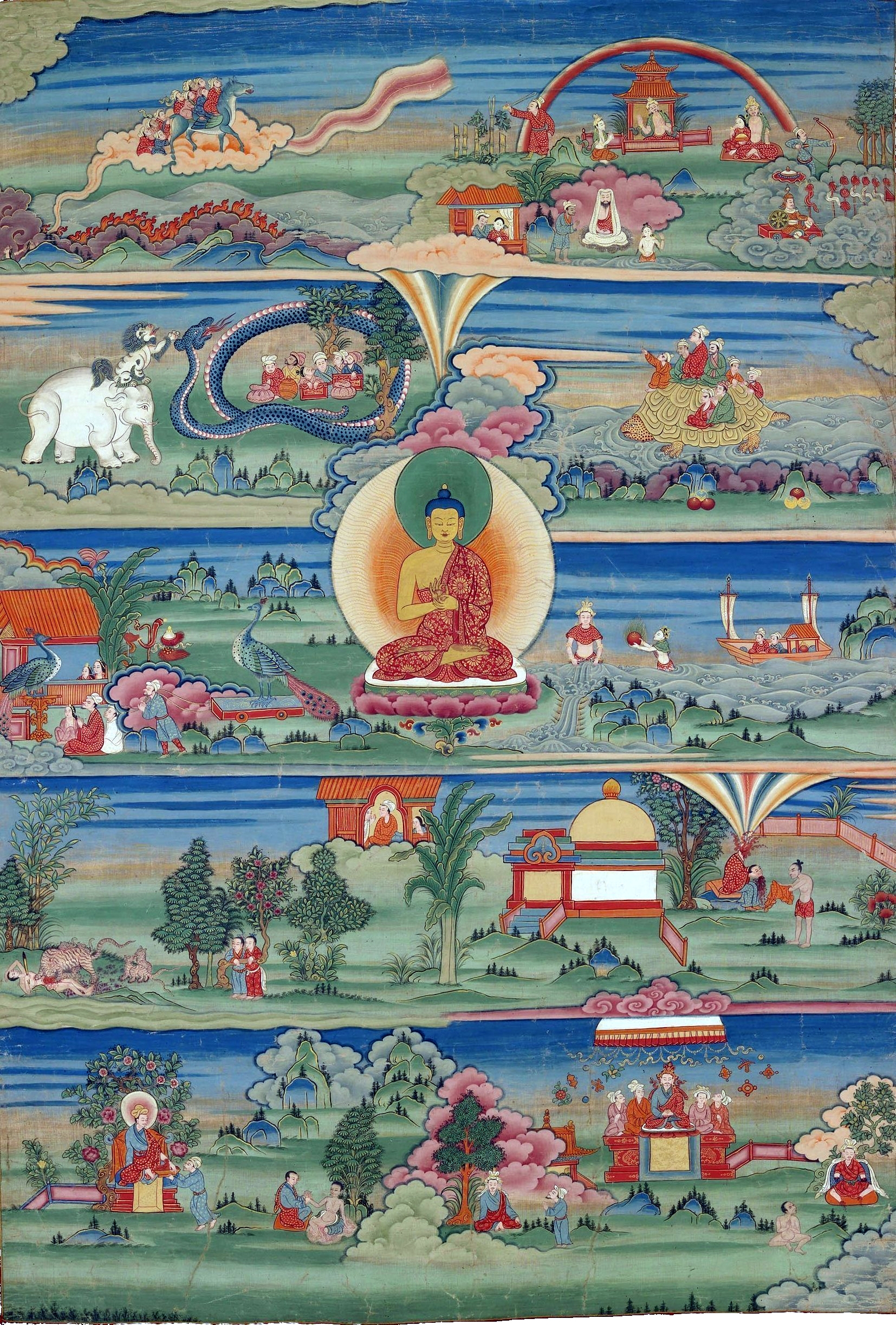
Bhutanese painted thangka of the Jataka Tales, 18th-19th century, Phajoding Gonpa, Thimphu, Bhutan

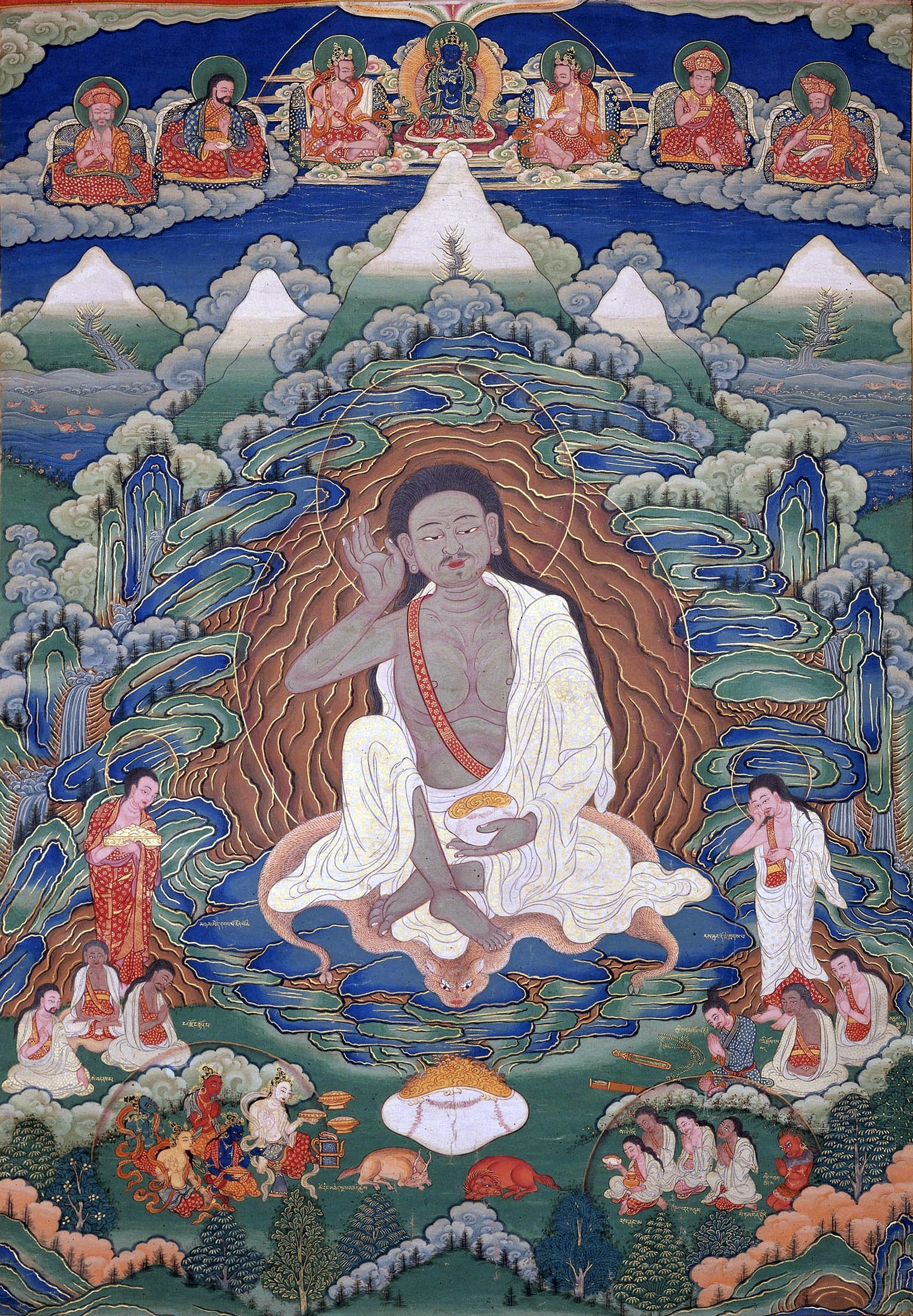
Bhutanese painted thanka of the Jataka Tales, 18th-19th Century, Phajoding Gonpa, Thimphu, Bhutan

== See also ==
- Phallus paintings in Bhutan
- Buddhism in Bhutan
- Dzong architecture
- Music of Bhutan
- Vajrayana Buddhism
- Eastern art history
