= Hudson Shakespeare Company =

The Hudson Shakespeare Company is a regional Shakespeare touring festival based in Jersey City in Hudson County, New Jersey, that produces an annual summer Shakespeare in the Park festival and often features lesser done Shakespeare works such as The Two Noble Kinsmen and Timon of Athens. The company also produces several modern-day productions in non theatrical venues such as their courtroom shows of Inherit the Wind and A Few Good Men in the Hoboken Municipal Courtroom. It produce a yearly educational program that ranges from student workshops to full length Shakespeare productions.

== History ==
In 1992, Jersey City native L. Robert "Luther" Johnson decided to mount a staged reading of "A Midsummer Night's Dream" in Hamilton Park in Jersey City. Having worked as a technical consultant for such companies as Riverside Shakespeare and New York Gilbert and Sullivan Players in New York, Johnson remarked "I noticed that when you were on one side of the Hudson you couldn't walk five feet without finding a company of actors doing Shakespeare, but on this side of the river there was nothing." He partnered with several theatrical friends who he had worked with previously in such community theaters as the Park Players of Union City and Civic Theater of Hudson County in Jersey City for this first production under the banner of "Hudson Shakespeare Company", named after Hudson County. While this first production featured "13 people on stage and 5 in the audience, he was undeterred and continued to produce Shakespeare under "Hudson Shakespeare Company" and modern works such as Driving Miss Daisy and Waiting for Godot under "Patchwork Theater Company".

In 1996, Johnson met fellow actor and director Jon Ciccarelli and the two reorganized all of the classical and modern productions under "Hudson Shakespeare Company". For the next few years, the company produced Shakespeare and modern programs in Jersey City and Hoboken and became the first theatrical company to produce a live theater showing at Hoboken's Frank Sinatra Park with another production of A Midsummer Night's Dream in 1998. In 2002, the company began touring to Hackensack, South Orange, and as far away as Stratford, Connecticut. Main stay venues such as Kenilworth and Fort Lee followed in 2004 and 2007 respectively.

== Lesser done works ==
Hudson Shakespeare Company has become known for tackling lesser known works and questionable works of the Bard. According to the artistic director, Jon Ciccarelli, "“Each season we try to produce at least one play that you’ve either never heard of or we put a different spin on known works of Shakespeare.” Lesser known plays tackled by the company: Edward III (2016), Arden of Faversham, (2015) Henry VIII (2013), Cardenio (based on Double Falsehood) (2012), Timon of Athens (2011), Troilus and Cressida (2009), King John (2008), The Two Noble Kinsmen (2007), Coriolanus (2004), Cymbeline (2004 & 2014), Pericles (2006 & 2014), Titus Andronicus (2003 & 2013).

== Performance venues ==
The following is a list of active venues where the company performs during an average run for a summer production.

=== Jersey City ===
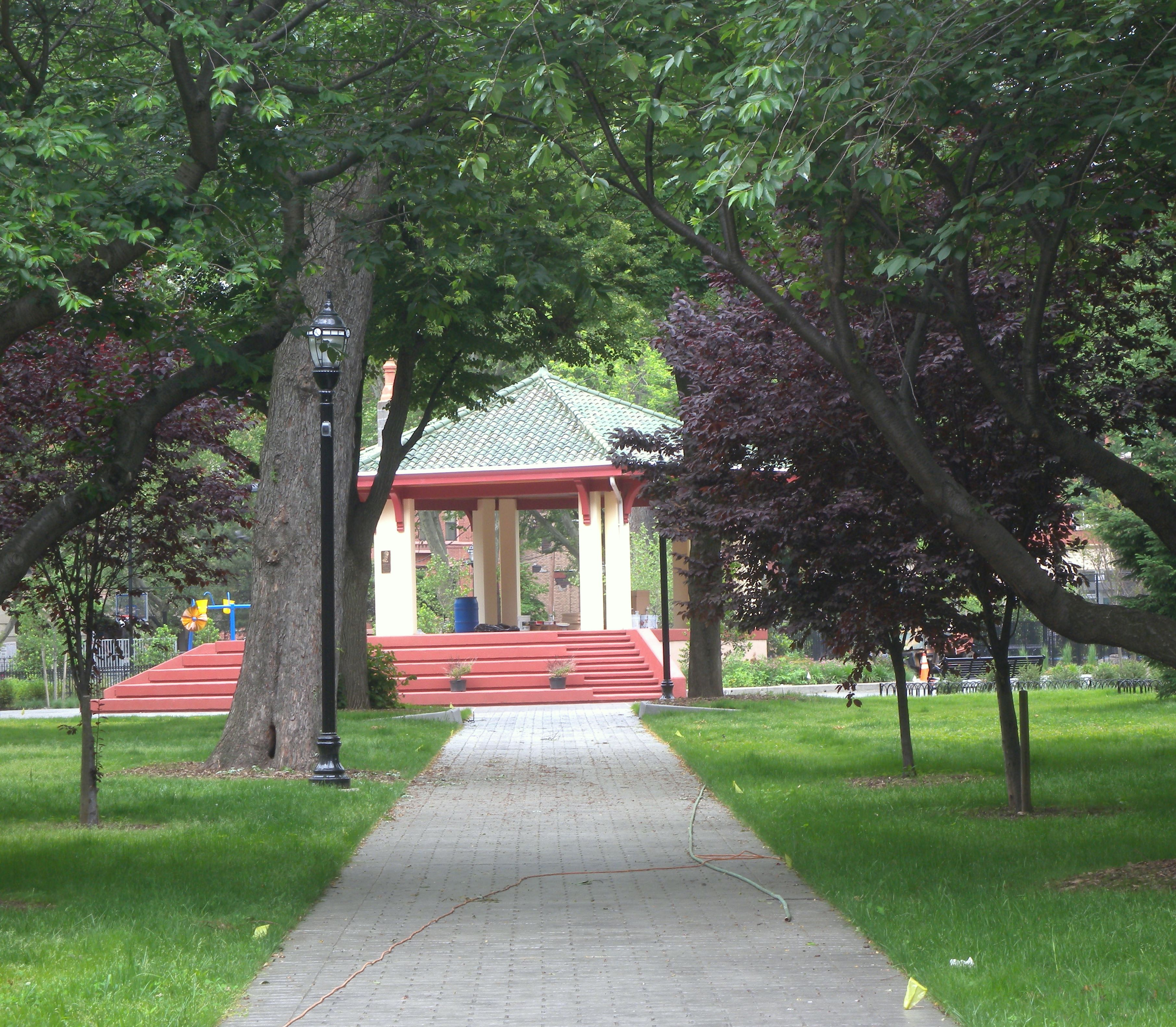
Hamilton Park

- Hamilton Park – Located at 9th Street and Jersey Avenue, this is the company's original performance space. HSC partners with the Hamilton Park Neighborhood Association and usually performs in front of the park's gazebo. In case of inclement weather, performances are held under the gazebo.
- Van Vorst Park – Located in the downtown section of Jersey City at Montgomery Street and Jersey Avenue, next to the main branch of the Jersey City library. HSC partners with the Friends of Van Vorst Park Association.
- Jersey City and Harsimus Cemetery – At 435 Newark Avenue, the cemetery is the oldest in the city and contains remains dating back to before the revolutionary war. HSC partners with the all volunteer group to raise funds for the cemetery's upkeep.

=== Hoboken ===
- Frank Sinatra Park – Located at 400 Frank Sinatra Drive, the venue is Hoboken's main venue for live music and theater acts. All HSC theater programs are produced with the Hoboken Division of Cultural Affairs which schedules, concerts, films and a semi-annual arts and music festival taking place in May and September.

=== Hackensack, New Jersey ===
- Staib Park – Located between Coles and Davis Avenue in Hackensack, New Jersey. HSC programs are produced in association with the Hackensack Recreation Department
- Hackensack Cultural Arts Center – Located at 39 Broadway in Hackensack, this converted church serves as the rain location for HSC shows and also as a year-round theater for other Hackensack companies.

=== Stratford, Connecticut ===
- Stratford Library – Located at 2203 Main Street, Stratford, Connecticut, the library not only hosts HSC but offers speakers on Shakespeare subjects and staged readings by resident theater company -Square One Theatre

=== Kenilworth, New Jersey ===
- Kenilworth Library – Located at 548 Boulevard in Kenilworth, New Jersey. HSC produces the "Bard on the Boulevard" program in association with the Friends of Kenilworth Library.

=== Westfield, New Jersey ===
- Westfield Memorial Library – Located at 550 E. Broad Street in Westfield, New Jersey

=== Fort Lee, New Jersey ===
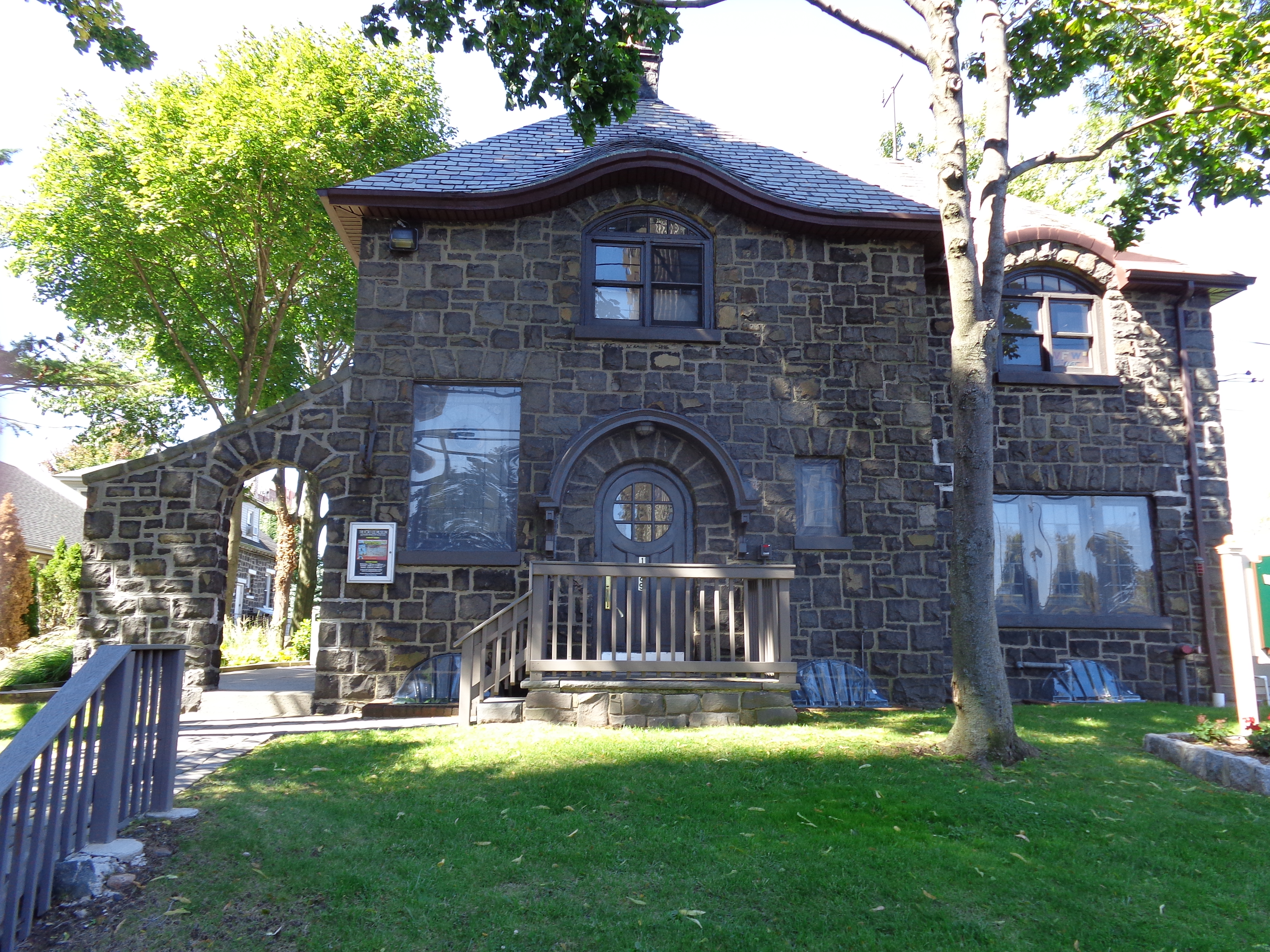
Fort Lee Museum

Monument Park at Palisade Avenue adjacent to the Fort Lee Museum. HSC produces programs in association with the Fort Lee Film Commission.

=== West Milford, New Jersey ===
- Long Pond Iron Works State Park – Located at 1334 Greenwood Lake Turnpike in Hewitt, New Jersey, HSC produces programs in association with the Friends of Long Pond Iron Works in their historic village.

== Recent productions ==
=== 2016 ===
- Richard II By William Shakespeare, directed by Noelle Fair – June 8–25
- Edward III By William Shakespeare and Thomas Kyd, directed by Jon Ciccarelli – July 12–30
- Henry IV, Part 1 and Henry IV, Part 2, directed by Jon Ciccarelli – August 12–27

=== 2015 ===
- The Winter's Tale By William Shakespeare, directed by Jon Ciccarelli – March 20 – April 12
- Love's Labours Lost By William Shakespeare, directed by Jon Ciccarelli – June 11–27
- Arden of Faversham attributed to William Shakespeare, Christopher Marlowe and Thomas Kyd, directed by Jon Ciccarelli – July 9–25
- The Two Gentlemen of Verona by William Shakespeare, directed by Jon Ciccarelli – August 5 to 22

=== 2014 ===
- Twelfth Night – By William Shakespeare, directed by James Masciovecchio – June 12–28
- Cymbeline – By William Shakespeare, directed by Rachel Alt – July 10–28
- Pericles – By William Shakespeare and George Wilkins, directed by Noelle Fair – August 7–23
- On the Waterfront By Budd Schulberg, directed by Gene Simakowicz – October 10–18

=== 2013 ===
- Inherit the Wind – By Jerome Lawrence and Robert E. Lee, directed by Jon Ciccarelli – April 12–20
- Cyrano de Bergerac – By Edmond Rostand, Adapted by Jon Ciccarelli, directed by Gene Simakowicz – June 14–29
- Henry VIII – By William Shakespeare and John Fletcher, directed by Jon Ciccarelli – July 11–27
- Macbeth – By William Shakespeare, directed by Noelle Fair – August 8–24
- Titus Andronicus – By William Shakespeare and George Peele, directed by Jon Ciccarelli – October 18-November 3
- As You Like It (All female Schools Show) – By William Shakespeare, directed by Noelle Fair – October 29 – November 1

== Educational programs ==
Hudson Shakespeare Company conducts a yearly educational program that ranges from presentation of full Shakespeare shows to selected scene showcases to Shakespeare workshops and stage combat workshops. Shakespeare workshops have included:

- Shakespeare Scene study – (Basic breaking down of text and staging monologues and scenes)
- Early Modern Theater, Recreating Shakespeare's Theater (Using practices that were utilized during Shakespeare's day such as cue scripts)
- Shakespeare on Film and On-Camera scene study (staging scenes using on-camera techniques)
- Unarmed Stage Combat (Instruction on falls, punches, slaps and other stage combat not involving weaponry
- Armed Stage Combat (Instruction in fighting with stage weaponry such as different types of swords)

Among the educational institutions that the group has worked with are St. Mary's High School and Kenmare High School in Jersey City, Fort Lee High School, David Brearly Middle School (Kenilworth), David Schectner Middle School (West Orange), the Hackensack Cultural Arts Center/Hackensack High School and Misericordia University (Dallas, Pennsylvania).

== Notable mentions ==
In 1998, the company produced A Midsummer Night's Dream as the first live theatrical performance held at the newly dedicated Frank Sinatra Park in Hoboken, New Jersey.

In 2005, company founder L. Robert Johnson was honored with the "Everyday Hero Award" by the newspaper The Jersey Journal. These awards and related feature article chronicle everyday citizens of Hudson County with outstanding contributions to their communities. In Mr. Johnson's case it was for his founding of Hudson Shakespeare Company and promotion of Shakespeare in Hudson County along with spearheading several educational programs mentoring novice acting students.

In 2009, the company was nominated for several awards including for stage fight choreography and costuming in the New York Midtown International Theatre Festival for its production of The Sword Politik by Jon Crefeld.

The company was noted in the New Cambridge edition (2012) of The Two Noble Kinsmen as one of several companies throughout the world that had produced the little done play.

New Jersey City University professor, James Broderick, profiled several Hudson Shakespeare Company actors in his book Greatness Thrust Upon Them: Non-Professional Actors and Directors Discuss Their Encounters with Shakespeare. (2014). The book chronicled the actors' first experiences with the Bard, the intimidation and overcoming these hurdles to fully embrace the work and how it shaped their semi-professional and professional careers

In 2015, the company produced Arden of Faversham as the first live show for the newly opened Atlantic Street Park in Hackensack, New Jersey.
