= Westfield Fire Headquarters =

- U.S. National Register of Historic Places
- New Jersey Register of Historic Places
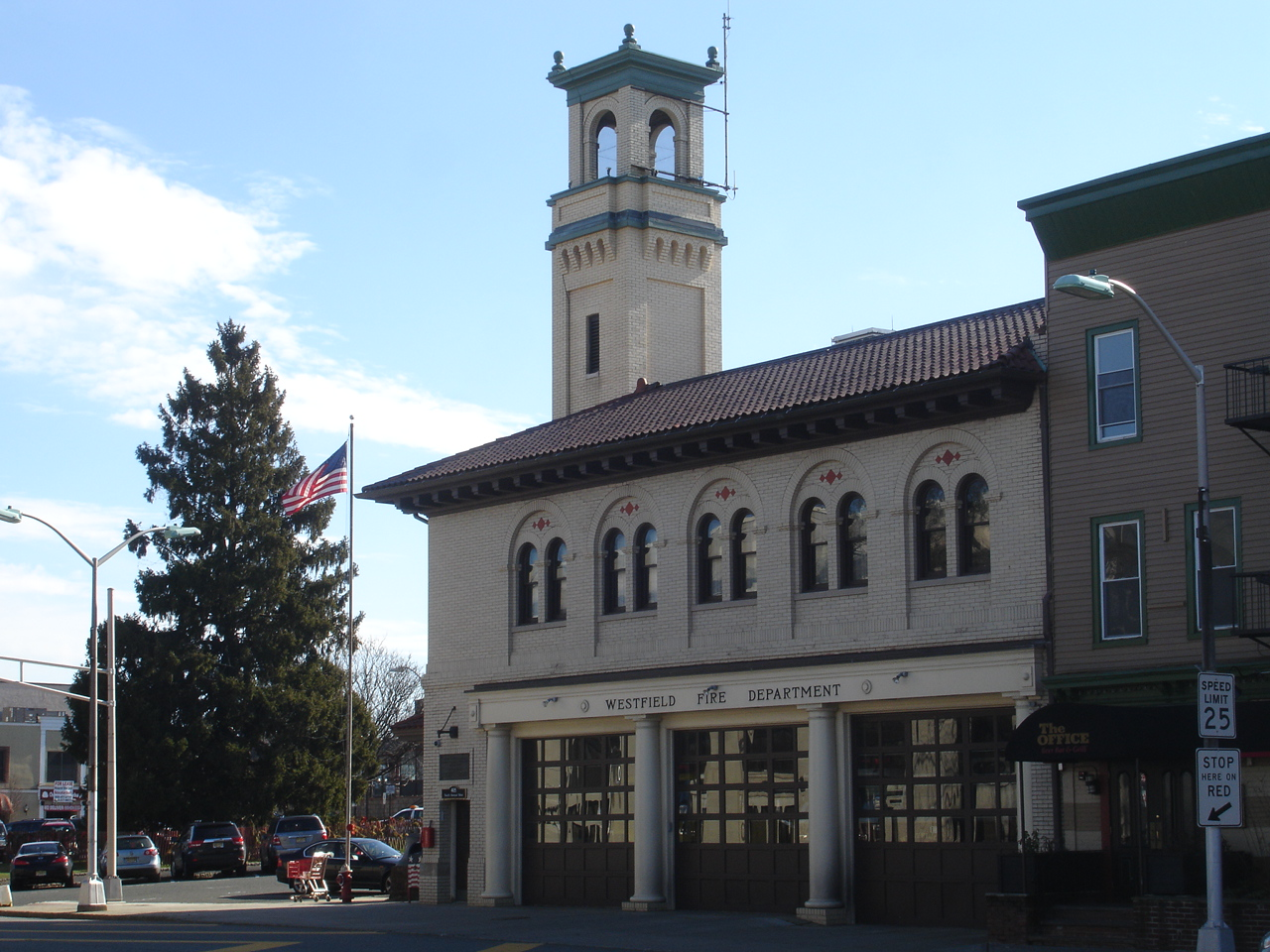
- The Westfield Fire Headquarters in January 2012

- Location within Union County, New Jersey Location within New Jersey Location within the United States
- Location: 405 North Avenue, W., Westfield, New Jersey
- Coordinates: 40°39′0″N 74°20′56″W
- Area: less than one acre
- Built: 1911
- Architect: Goltra, John; Darsh, Charles H.
- Architectural style: Italianate, Spanish;Mediterranean
- NRHP reference No.: 80002524
- NJRHP No.: 2738

Significant dates
- Added to NRHP: December 8, 1980
- Designated NJRHP: December 3, 1980

Westfield Fire Headquarters is located in Westfield, Union County, New Jersey, United States. The firehouse was built in 1911 and added to the National Register of Historic Places on December 8, 1980.

== See also ==
- National Register of Historic Places listings in Union County, New Jersey
