= Presbyterian Church (Westfield, New Jersey) =

Coordinates: 40.6539°N 74.3476°W

The Presbyterian Church in Westfield, New Jersey was established in 1728, when twelve to eighteen of the early settlers built a log house for worship near what is now Benson Place.

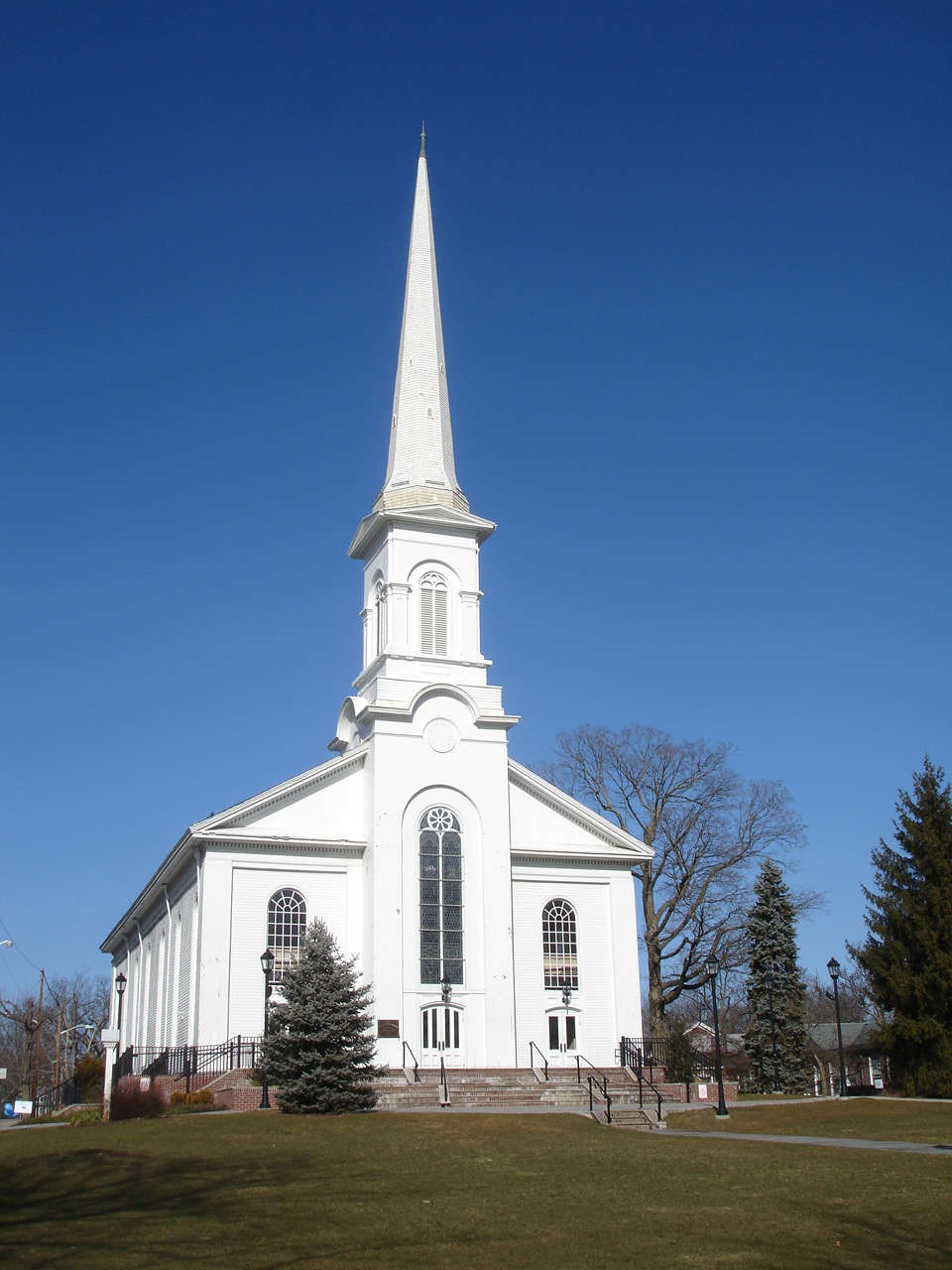
The Westfield Presbyterian Church in January 2012

== History ==
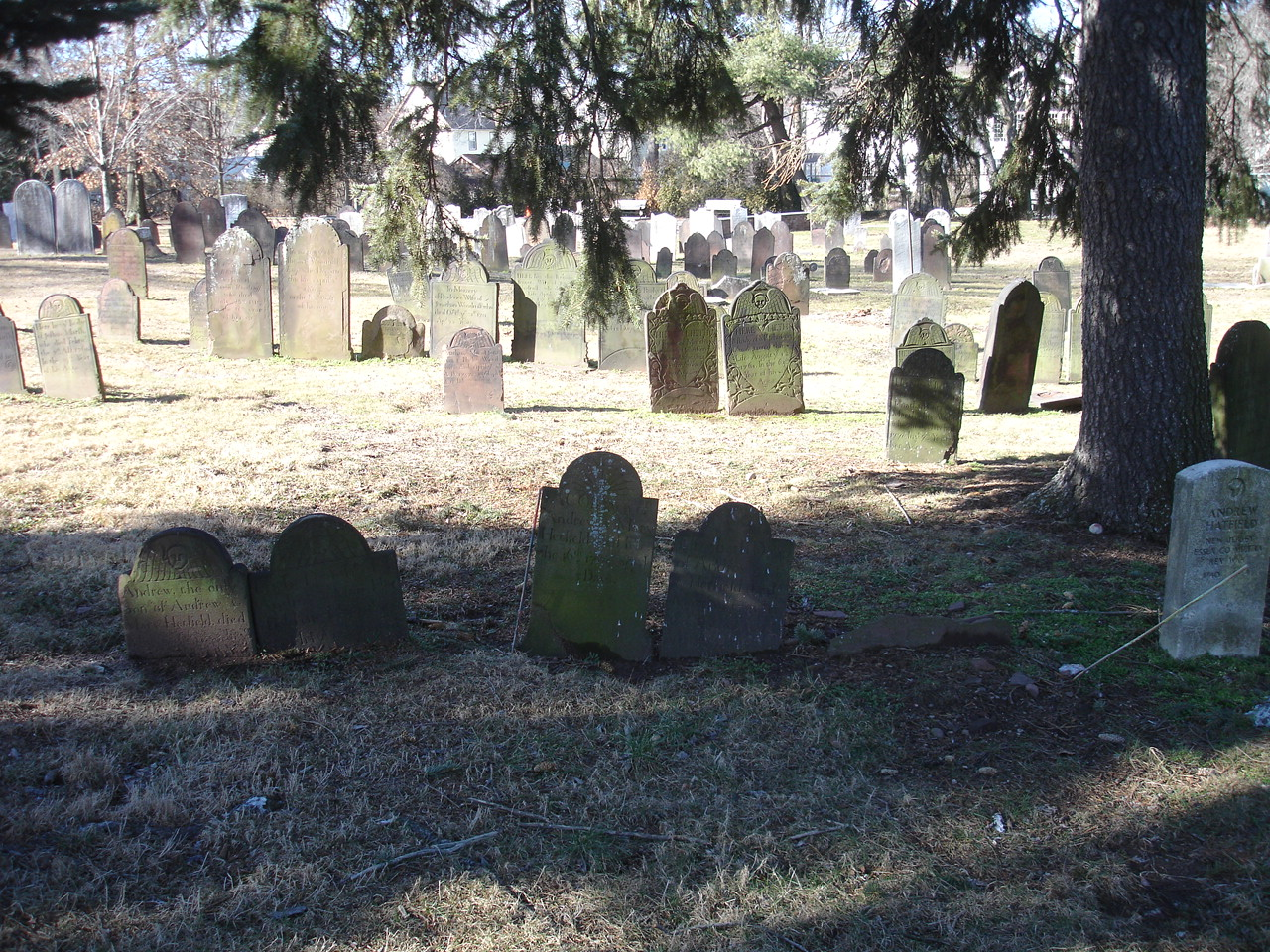
The Westfield Presbyterian Church Burying Ground in January, 2012

The Presbyterian Church in the West Fields of Elizabethtown was established in 1728. A great drum was sounded to call people to services. Before then, many of these God-fearing pioneers would make the all-day trip to Elizabeth to attend services, the men carrying firearms to protect themselves from Indians.

On November 5, 1734 the congregation bought 40 acres (160,000 m^{2}), roughly the area bounded now by the back of the church cemetery on Mountain Avenue, Kimball Avenue, the middle of Mindowaskin Park and East Broad Street. The price was £20. Though the site was reduced or sold over time to about 7 acres (28,000 m^{2}), it is the site the congregation has occupied ever since. A small building was erected.

It is not known when the second building was erected, but it was probably about 1734 and was situated at the intersection of East Broad Street and Mountain Avenue. The third building was set directly behind its predecessor and was first used about 1805. The present building was erected in 1861, slightly up the hill from the previous one and the sanctuary with the large church spire remains to this day as the main building for worship. An additional building known as “Westminster Hall” was originally designated as a lecture hall. It was built in 1853 and has been added to from time to time, with the last renovation taking place in 1908.

During the American Revolution, the church pastor was the Reverend Benjamin Woodruff, a staunch patriot. On June 26, 1777, he had the church bell rung to warn residents that some 14,000 British troops were approaching. Again, on June 23, 1780, the bell warned residents that the Redcoats were coming. This time, British soldiers climbed to the belfry and flung the bell to the ground. Tradition says the bell was taken to Staten Island where, later, a prisoner from Westfield heard it ringing and recognized its tone. Eventually it was returned and rehung in the belfry.

Reverend Woodruff and his wife are buried under the vestibule of the present building; a plaque near the front door commemorates his long and devoted service.

About 1818 the first Sunday School was started. Education was important to local Presbyterians, who gave the grounds for the first Westfield academy; and the public schools of Westfield grew out of that institution.

In the early days sermons could last up to two hours. Wood stoves provided some heat, but members often brought foot warmers in the winter. Light was by candles. Muddy roads made carpets impractical; instead, the floor was covered with a thick layer of sand. Along the side of Mountain Avenue was a long row of posts to which horses were tied. Singing was conducted by a presenter who stood before the congregation, gave the pitch from a tuning fork, and sang out the tune in "a loud, stentorious voice".

Before the American Civil War, church members occasionally voted to take action for or against certain civic practices. In 1847, Session successfully protested to railroad officials the running of trains through Westfield on the Sabbath. Until 1870, Session heard cases involving offenses against the civil law as well as against the discipline of the Session. Some cases involved the moral and spiritual rectitude of church members; a typical offense charged against some young men was intemperance. Others concerned absence from worship service, slander, lying, theft, etc.

Long after the Revolution, religion and patriotism went hand in hand for church members. For many years each church trustee swore to support the Constitution of the United States.

The present church structure, built during the early part of the Civil War, was dedicated on March 25, 1862. The congregation at that time numbered less than 250, but the new structure had a seating capacity of 800.

In 1875 a pipe organ was installed. Two years later a choir loft was added and a variety of music and choral groups have been introduced over the years.

The cemetery across Mountain Avenue is part of the Church property and was first used for burial about 1720. Seventy-three veterans of the Revolutionary War are buried there. Local men preparing for the War of 1812 are said to have trained on the church grounds. Others fought in the Civil War, the Spanish–American War and both of the 20th century world wars. Three lost their lives in World War I, twelve in World War II, and three more in the following Cold War.

Embracing a theme of the Presbyterian Synod that "a giving church is a living church," the Presbyterian Church in Westfield has for many years donated generously to missions and missionaries. The earliest record shows that the church in 1801 gave $70 "for gospellizing the Indians and other pious purposes". In 1876 there were 26 special collections taken for Home Missions, Foreign Missions and other local, national and foreign mission needs. Starting in 1904 church records contain a long list of missionaries supported wholly or in part by this church. At the end of World War II, the church sponsored six refugee families, helping them find housing and employment in the area.

Further outreach to the needy in Westfield and Union County continues. Four to six times per year 14 single women and/or families who find themselves temporarily homeless are housed in the church and provided with food, beds and bathing facilities. Every Wednesday, young people and adults of the congregation, working on our "Agape Project," prepare over 250 dinners and take them to a Presbyterian church in Elizabeth where they are served to people experiencing food insecurity. Our deacons and other members also work regularly at the huge Community Food Bank in Hillside.

As the Town of Westfield has grown from a quaint rural village into a modern commuter town, so the Church has grown from a mere handful of God-fearing people to a congregation of approximately 1,600 members. Over the years, the growth of the congregation and of the Sunday Church School, founded in 1818, made necessary increases in the buildings on the campus of The Presbyterian Church in Westfield.

The first part of the Parish House was completed in 1926 and a large addition, including the Chapel and Assembly Hall was finished in 1949. The building known as Westminster Hall was originally called a Lecture Room. It was built in 1853 and has been added to from time to time, the last renovation taking place in 1958. Extensive changes were made in the main Church building, when a chancel was added and a new organ installed in 1952.

Following World War II, the Church experienced a huge increase in membership. By 1962 it had reached a peak of 4,569 members and the decision was made to add more seating capacity by "stretching" the sanctuary building to 1,000 seats. During 1964 and 1965, the sanctuary was split in two and the front section of the church containing the narthex and the spire was moved forward to increase the seating capacity in the church. This remarkable project actually added 30 feet (9.1 m) to the sanctuary without noticeable change to the interior or exterior appearance of the building. You can see the “split lines on the sanctuary walls which clearly mark the expansion. The “Christian Education” building was added on as a part of the 1964 construction and built for the rapidly expanding Sunday school program.

In 1997, using money from several bequests, a major renovation of the sanctuary was made. The scope of the work included a new sound system, carpet, enlarged Narthex, air conditioning, new lighting system and chandeliers, redesigned chancel, sound enhancement and accessibility improvements. In 2007, a new terrace project was completed and gives the church a safe and welcoming entryway.

A complete history of The Presbyterian Church in Westfield is available in the church library, and members of the staff are always glad to conduct visitors through the buildings. With advance notice, group tours through The Presbyterian Church Cemetery can be arranged.

The Church is featured prominently in the opening credits of the NBC television show Ed. Although the series took place in fictional Stuckyville, Ohio, Tom Cavannaugh (Ed) drives through Westfield, drives past the church while taking in the sites of his hometown.
