= Westfield, New Jersey =

Town in Union County, New Jersey, US

- Town
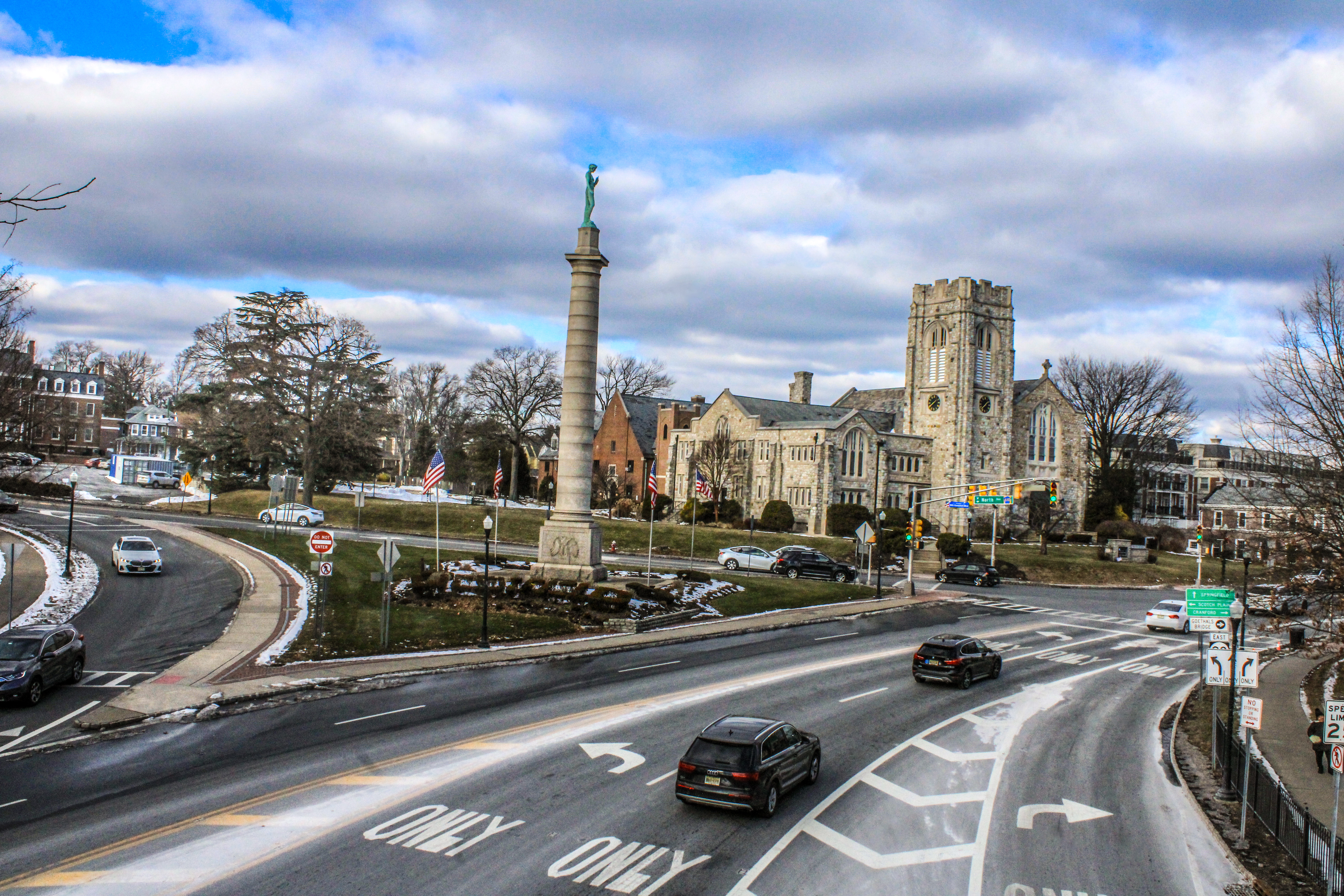
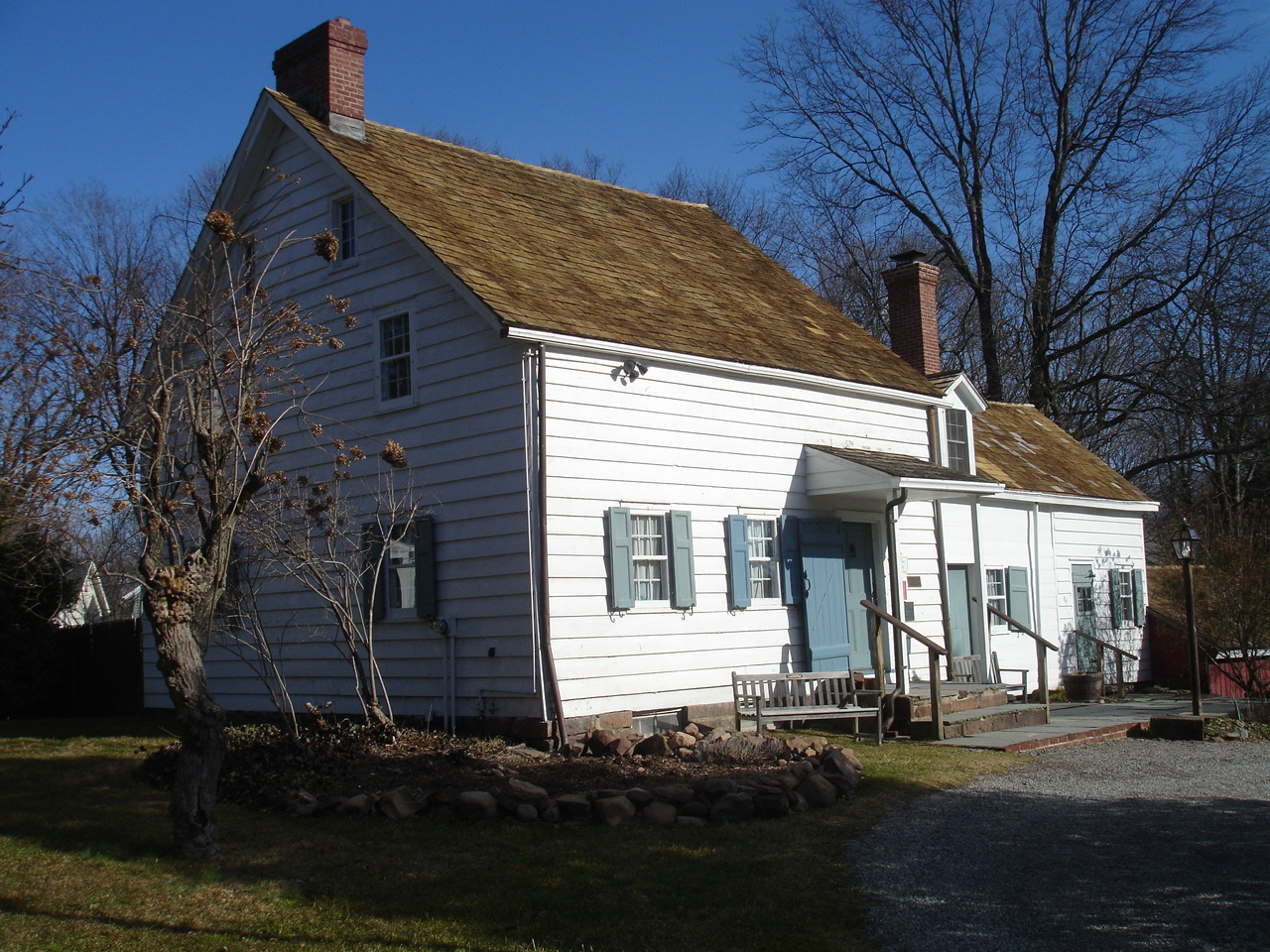
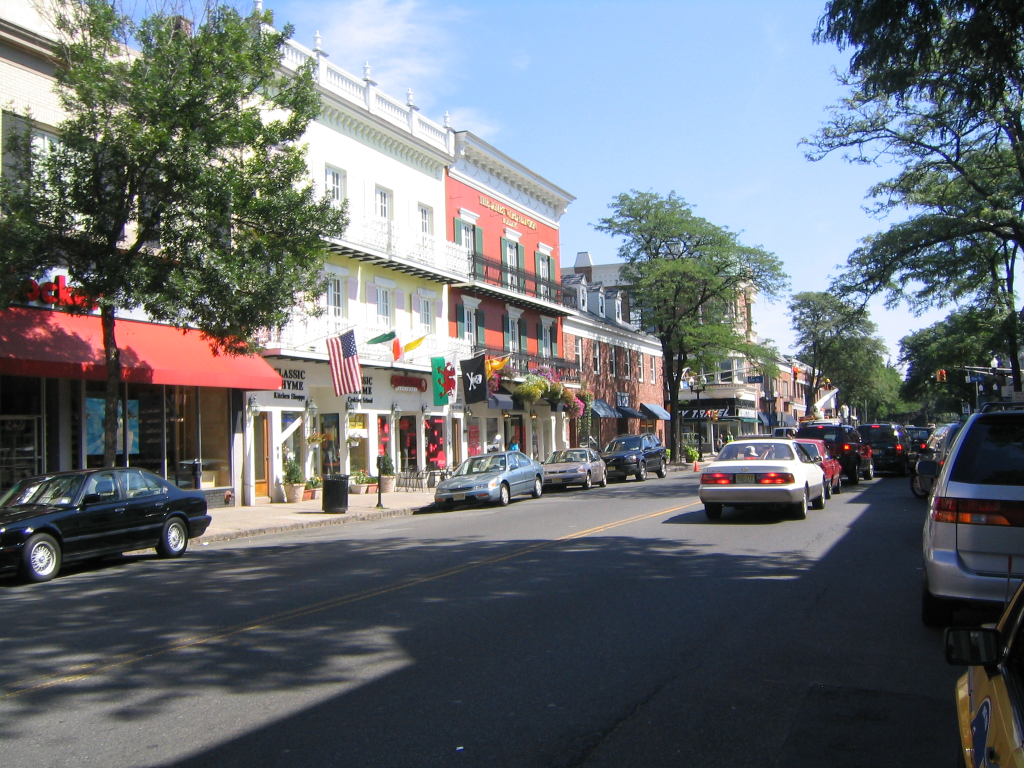
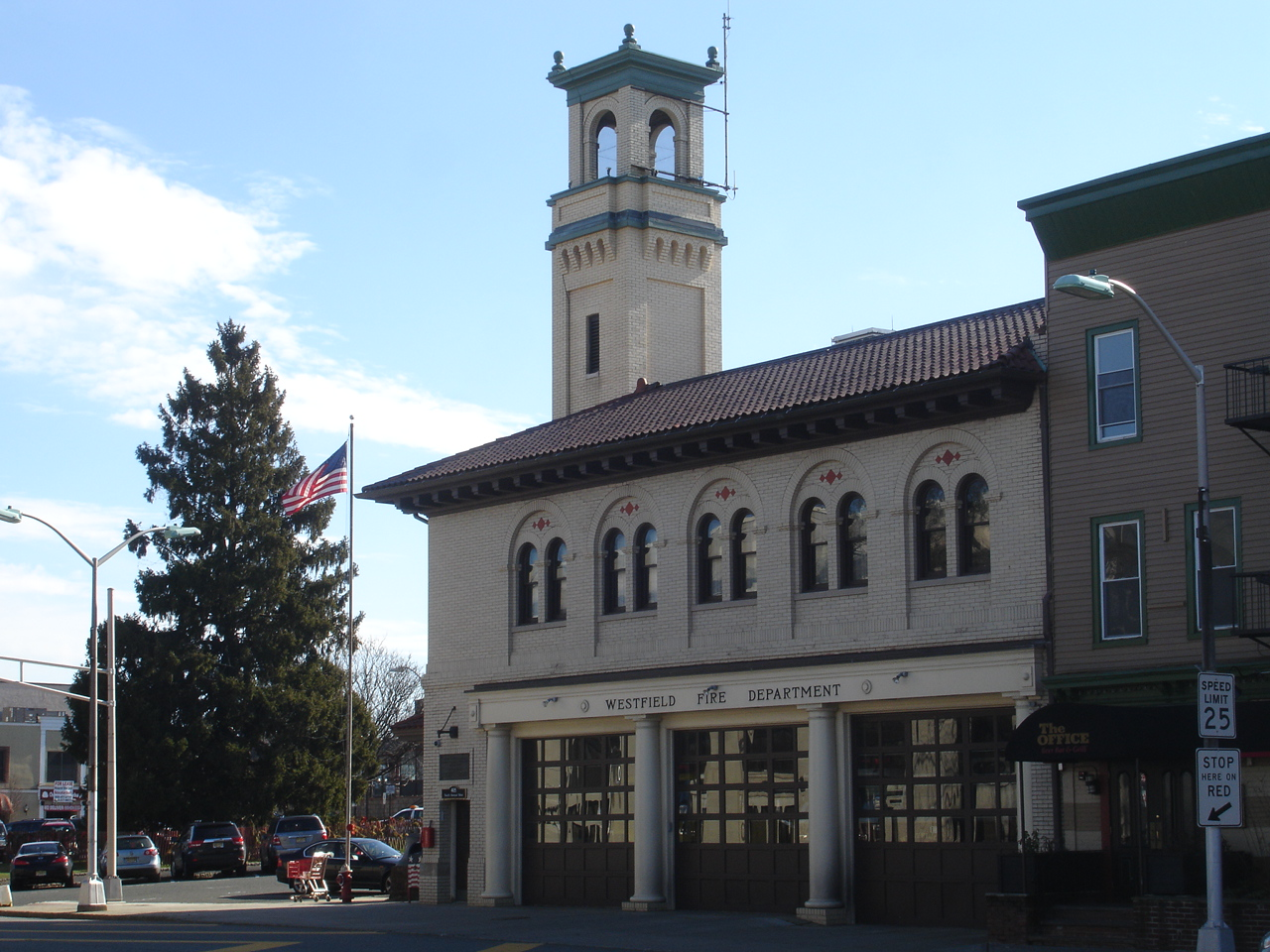
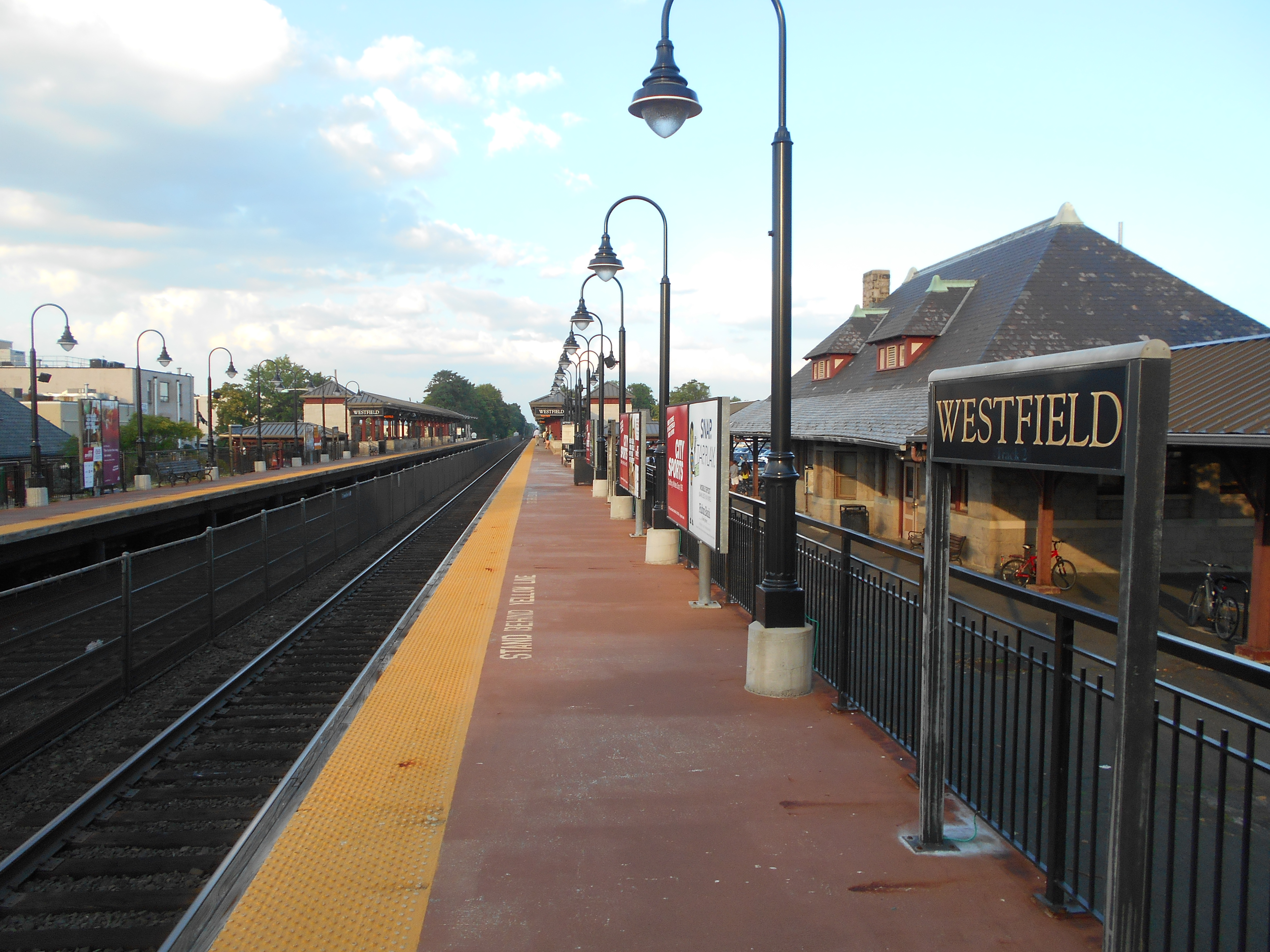
- Intersection of North Avenue W. and East Broad Street Miller-Cory House Downtown Westfield along East Broad Street Westfield Fire Headquarters Westfield station

- Seal

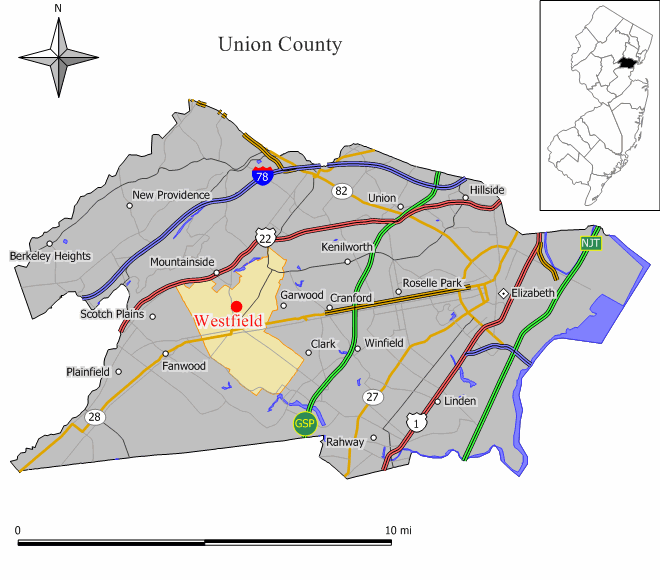
- Map of Westfield in Union County. Inset: Location of Union County highlighted in the State of New Jersey.

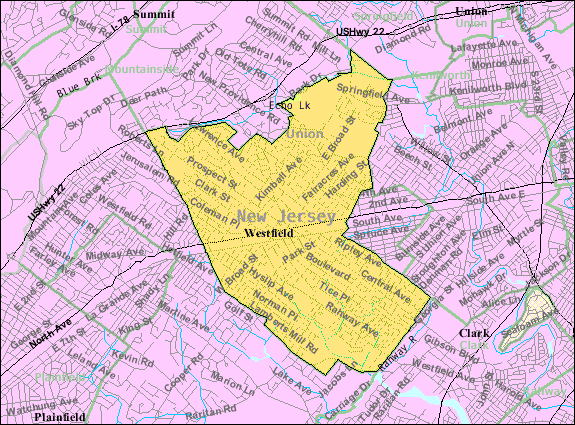
- Census Bureau map of Westfield, New Jersey

- Location in Union County Location in New Jersey Location in the United States
- Coordinates: 40.651644°N 74.343447°W
- Country: United States
- State: New Jersey
- County: Union
- Formed: January 27, 1794
- Incorporated: February 21, 1798 (as township)
- Reincorporated: March 4, 1903 (as town)

Government
  - Type: Special charter
  - Body: Town Council
  - Mayor: Jeremy Berman (D, term ends December 31, 2029)
  - Administrator: James H. Gildea
  - Municipal clerk: Maureen Lawshe

Area
  - Total: 6.74 sq mi (17.46 km^{2})
  - Land: 6.73 sq mi (17.42 km^{2})
  - Water: 0.019 sq mi (0.05 km^{2}) 0.28%
  - Rank: 246th of 565 in state 5th of 21 in county
- Elevation: 118 ft (36 m)

Population (2020)
  - Total: 31,032
  - Estimate (2023): 30,559
  - Rank: 77th of 565 in state 5th of 21 in county
  - Density: 4,615.1/sq mi (1,781.9/km^{2})
  - Rank: 126th of 565 in state 12th of 21 in county
- Time zone: UTC−05:00 (Eastern (EST))
  - Summer (DST): UTC−04:00 (Eastern (EDT))
- ZIP Codes: 07090–07091
- Area code: 908
- FIPS code: 3403979040
- GNIS feature ID: 0885436
- Website: www.westfieldnj.gov

Westfield is a town in Union County, in the U.S. state of New Jersey. Located within the heart of the Rahway Valley region, Westfield is a bustling commercial and cultural hub in northern–central New Jersey, and it is a wealthy bedroom community of New York City within the New York metropolitan area (located 16 miles (26 km) southwest of New York City). In March 2018, Bloomberg ranked Westfield as the 99th highest-income place in the United States, and the 18th highest-income location in New Jersey. According to a 2014 nationwide survey, Westfield was ranked as the 30th-safest city to live in the United States.

As of the 2020 United States census, the town's population was 31,032, an increase of 716 (+2.4%) from the 2010 census count of 30,316, which in turn reflected an increase of 672 (+2.3%) from the 29,644 counted in the 2000 census. The town has been one of the state's highest-income communities. Based on data from the American Community Survey for 2013–2017, Westfield residents had a median household income of $159,923, ranked 8th in the state among municipalities with more than 10,000 residents, more than double the statewide median of $76,475.

== History ==
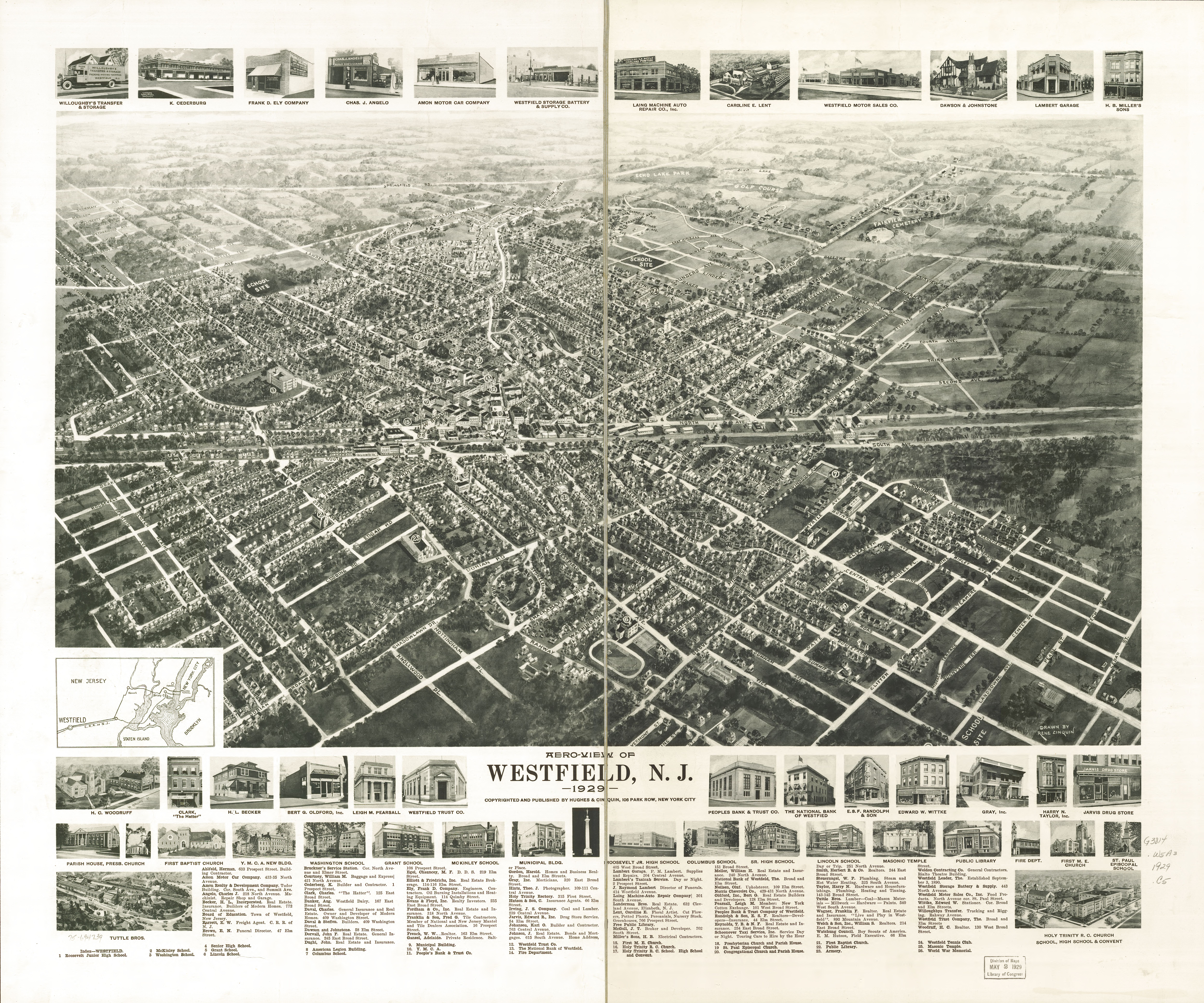
Panoramic map of Westfield with inset images and listings of landmarks (1929)

Westfield took its name from the rich "fields west of Elizabeth Town, and hence for over one hundred years went by the name of West Fields." Town records say that "the settlement of Westfield dates back to the last year (1699) of the seventeenth century. It was the result of the 'Clinker Lot Division.' Almost immediately after the division emigration from the older parts of the town of Elizabeth began to set towards the interior,—especially to the territory lying between the Rahway river, on the east, and the mountains, on the west. It was not, however, until 1720 that the settlers became numerous enough to constitute a distinct community." The old village area, now the downtown district, was settled in 1720 as part of the Elizabethtown Tract.

Westfield was originally formed as a township on January 27, 1794, from portions of Elizabeth Township, while the area was still part of Essex County, and was incorporated on February 21, 1798, as one of New Jersey's initial group of 104 townships by an act of the New Jersey Legislature. It became part of the newly formed Union County on March 19, 1857. Portions of the township have been taken to form Rahway Township (February 27, 1804), Plainfield Township (April 5, 1847), Cranford Township (March 14, 1871), Fanwood Township (March 6, 1878; now known as Scotch Plains) and Mountainside (September 25, 1895). The Town of Westfield was incorporated on March 4, 1903, replacing Westfield Township. The name of the town is derived from its location in the western, undeveloped fields of the Elizabethtown tract.

== Geography ==
According to the United States Census Bureau, the town had a total area of 6.74 square miles (17.46 km^{2}), including 6.72 square miles (17.42 km^{2}) of land and 0.02 square miles (0.05 km^{2}) of water (0.28%).

Unincorporated communities, localities and place names located partially or completely within the township include Germantown and Tamaques Reservation Mill.

Six municipalities border the town of Westfield: Mountainside to the north, Springfield Township to the northeast, Garwood and Cranford to the east, Clark to the southeast, and Scotch Plains to the west and southwest.

The upper reaches of the Rahway River Parkway run through the township along tributaries of the Rahway River.

The Robinson's Branch of the Rahway River additionally flows through the southern portion of Westfield en route to the Robinson's Branch Reservoir, also known as the Clark Reservoir.

It is located about one hour from Manhattan.

== Community ==
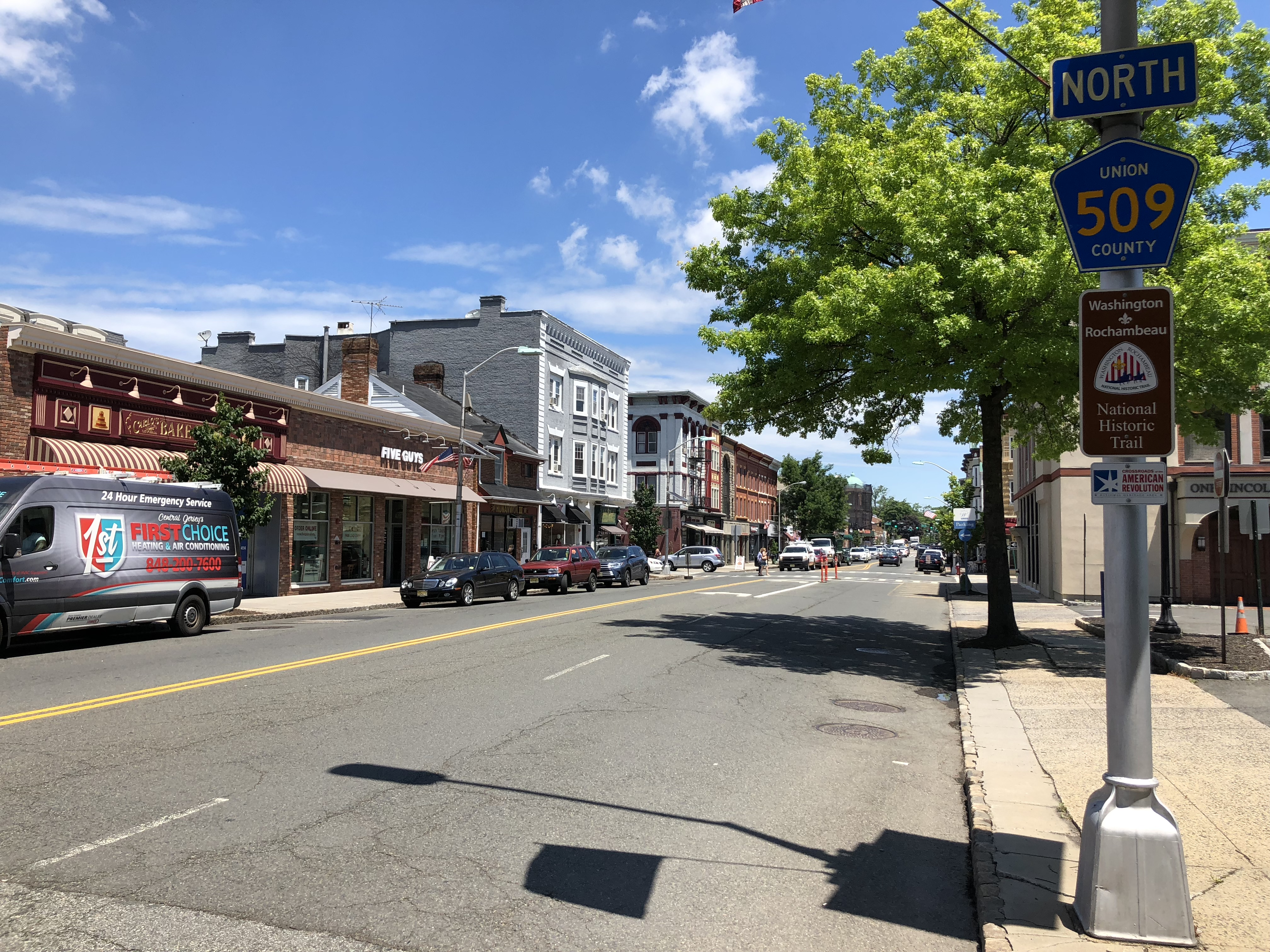
Downtown Westfield in 2018

=== Downtown ===
Westfield's downtown features many local and national stores and several landmarks that were shown and used in the NBC network television show Ed such as the Rialto Theater. There are over 40 restaurants and casual dining establishments throughout the downtown. Downtown is located mostly north of the Westfield train station. The downtown area has a mix of independent stores and boutiques as well as national stores. Over one-third of the retailers and restaurants have existed for 25 years or more.

Downtown Westfield, with over 200 retail establishments and 400 commercial enterprises, is a regional destination in New Jersey. The Downtown Westfield Corporation (DWC) manages the Special Improvement District (SID) area's growth and enhancement. The DWC participates in the National Main Street program associated with the National Trust for Historic Preservation. It is funded by a SID assessment on downtown properties and operates as the district's management agency. The DWC sponsors marketing efforts and promotions, special event planning, urban design and building improvement projects. The DWC works closely with the town government and volunteer groups to improve the downtown area. In 2004, Westfield won the Great American Main Street Award from the National Trust. In 2010, Westfield was the winner of the America in Bloom contest for communities with a population of 25,001–50,000 against the other two towns entered in their category. Shopping and dining in Westfield attracts citizens from other communities across the state.

Several war memorials (including ones dedicated to the Korean War, World War II, Spanish–American War, and the Vietnam War) are located in a plaza near the downtown. The plaza is also home to the September 11 Memorial Park, which pays special tribute to the residents of Westfield who died in the September 11 terrorist attacks.

Downtown Westfield hosts events and festivals throughout the year. Throughout the summer, jazz groups perform live, outdoors, every Tuesday night. October 2018 saw the first annual AddamsFest, honoring Westfield resident Charles Addams. The festival featured exhibits, lectures, film screenings, and a masquerade ball, among other things. Other festivals include the Spring Fling and FestiFall.

In August 2020, Le Tote announced that Lord & Taylor, the town's only department store and the chain's only freestanding location in New Jersey, would close as part of a plan to shut down 38 Lord & Taylor store nationwide. Efforts are being made to redevelop the site. Some disputes have arisen alleging overdevelopment at the site under the powers afforded to real estate developers under the Mount Laurel doctrine for affordable housing.

=== Library ===
The Westfield Memorial Library was founded in 1873 as the "Every Saturday Book Club" and has evolved over the past century into the Westfield Memorial Library of today. The Library is located in a large, modern, Williamsburg-style building at 550 East Broad Street. The library's collection consists of over 250,000 books, two dozen public computers, a wide array of multimedia options, a large youth services area with a vivid mural depicting Westfield history, and multiple tables and carrels for studying. The library offers classes for adults and children, storytimes for children, and computer instruction.

== Parks and recreation ==
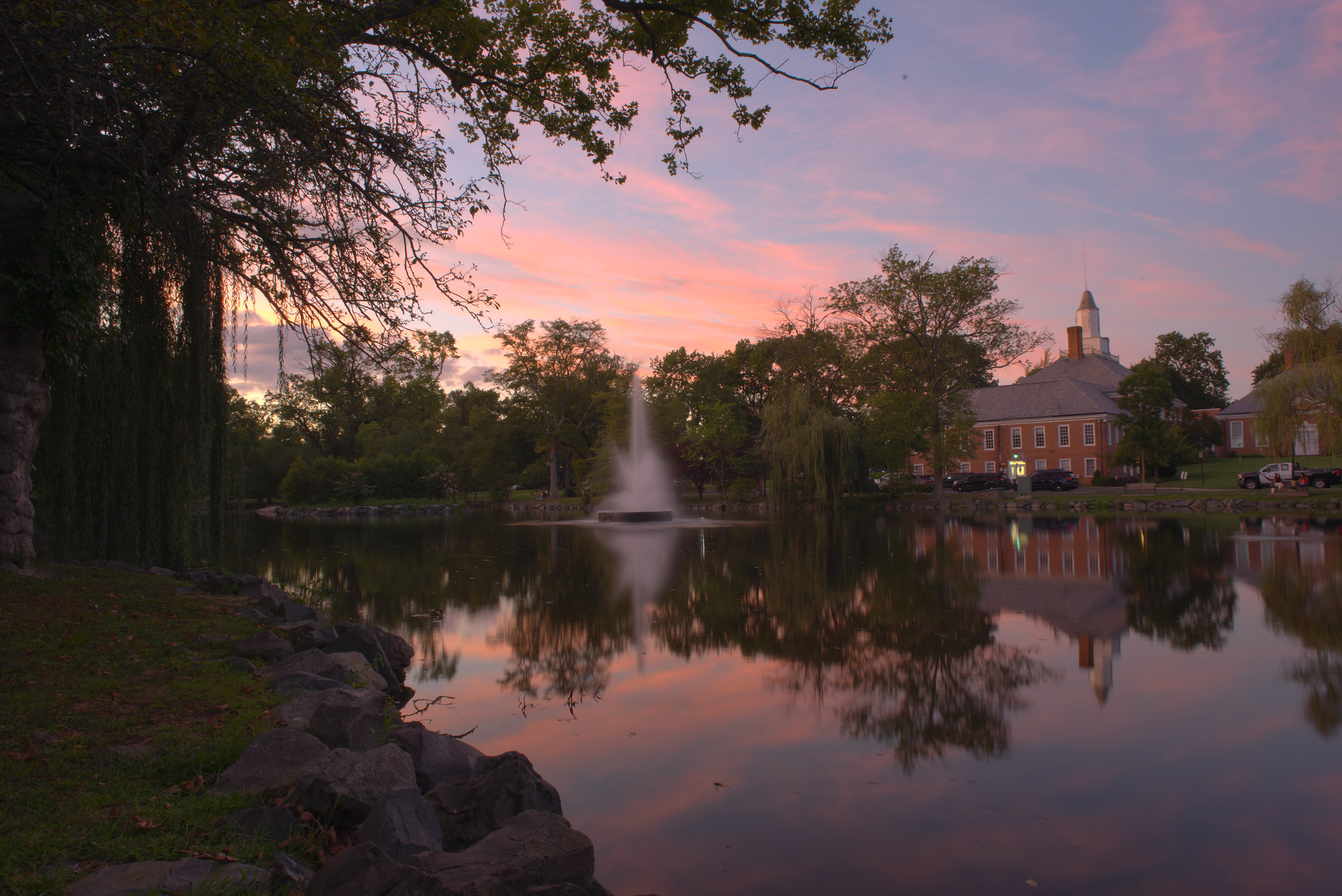
View of the pond in Mindowaskin Park in summer evening

Parks in the town include:

- Brightwood Park
- Gumbert Park
- Lenape Park, is a 450-acre (180 ha) wildlife reserve and park that is part of Union County's Rahway River Parkway. The park also includes portions of Cranford, Kenilworth and Springfield Township. An approximately 4.5-mile off-road paved pedestrian path stretches eastbound from Mountainside Police Headquarters in Mountainside, through Echo Lake Park in Westfield, Lenape Park in Westfield and Cranford, Black Brook Park in Kenilworth, and ending near 505 North Michigan Avenue in Kenilworth.
- Mindowaskin Park
- Tamaques Park
- Gary Kehler Stadium is named in honor of Gary Kehler (1931–2007), the former Westfield High School football coach and long-time town resident.

== Demographics ==
Historical population
Census	Pop.	Note	%±
1810	2,152		—
1820	2,358		9.6%
1830	2,492		5.7%
1840	3,150		26.4%
1850	1,577	*	−49.9%
1860	1,719		9.0%
1870	2,753		60.2%
1880	2,216	*	−19.5%
1890	2,739		23.6%
1900	4,328	*	58.0%
1910	6,420		48.3%
1920	9,063	*	41.2%
1930	15,801		74.3%
1940	18,458		16.8%
1950	21,243		15.1%
1960	31,447		48.0%
1970	33,720		7.2%
1980	30,447		−9.7%
1990	28,870		−5.2%
2000	29,644		2.7%
2010	30,316		2.3%
2020	31,032		2.4%
2023 (est.)	30,559	▼	−1.5%
Population sources: 1810–1920 1840 1850–1870; 1850 1870 1880–1890; 1890–1910 1910–1930; 1940–2000 2000; 2010 2020 * = Lost territory in previous decade.

=== Racial and ethnic composition ===
Westfield town, New Jersey – Racial and ethnic composition Note: the US Census treats Hispanic/Latino as an ethnic category. This table excludes Latinos from the racial categories and assigns them to a separate category. Hispanics/Latinos may be of any race.
Race / Ethnicity (NH = Non-Hispanic)	Pop 2000	Pop 2010	Pop 2020	% 2000	% 2010	% 2020
White alone (NH)	26,047	25,629	23,819	87.87%	84.54%	76.76%
Black or African American alone (NH)	1,137	940	790	3.84%	3.10%	2.55%
Native American or Alaska Native alone (NH)	26	20	19	0.09%	0.07%	0.06%
Asian alone (NH)	1,206	1,708	2,735	4.07%	5.63%	8.81%
Native Hawaiian or Pacific Islander alone (NH)	3	10	1	0.01%	0.03%	0.00%
Other race alone (NH)	53	49	150	0.18%	0.16%	0.48%
Mixed race or Multiracial (NH)	336	468	1,271	1.13%	1.54%	4.10%
Hispanic or Latino (any race)	836	1,492	2,247	2.82%	4.92%	7.24%
Total	29,644	30,316	31,032	100.00%	100.00%	100.00%

=== 2020 census ===
As of the 2020 census, Westfield had a population of 31,032. The population density was 4,615.1 per square mile (1,781.9/km^{2}). 100.0% of residents lived in urban areas, while 0.0% lived in rural areas.

There were 10,622 households in Westfield, of which 43.6% had children under the age of 18 living in them. Of all households, 69.3% were married-couple households, 9.3% were households with a male householder and no spouse or partner present, and 18.8% were households with a female householder and no spouse or partner present. About 17.9% of all households were made up of individuals, and 9.8% had someone living alone who was 65 years of age or older. There were 11,095 housing units, of which 4.3% were vacant. The homeowner vacancy rate was 1.4% and the rental vacancy rate was 6.1%. Housing units had an average density of 1,651.0 per square mile (637.5/km^{2}). The average household size was 2.93 and the average family size was 3.37.

The racial makeup was 78.23% (24,275) White, 2.62% (812) Black or African American, 0.14% (43) Native American, 8.85% (2,747) Asian, 0.01% (1) Pacific Islander, 1.80% (560) from other races, and 8.36% (2,594) from two or more races. Hispanic or Latino of any race were 7.24% (2,247) of the population.

The median age was 41.0 years. 28.0% of residents were under the age of 18 and 14.4% were 65 years of age or older. For every 100 females, there were 95.9 males, and for every 100 females age 18 and over there were 91.5 males age 18 and over.

=== 2010 census ===
The 2010 United States census counted 30,316 people, 10,566 households, and 8,199 families in the town. The population density was 4,512.2 per square mile (1,742.2/km^{2}). There were 10,950 housing units at an average density of 1,629.8 per square mile (629.3/km^{2}). The racial makeup was 88.17% (26,729) White, 3.25% (984) Black or African American, 0.12% (36) Native American, 5.67% (1,718) Asian, 0.03% (10) Pacific Islander, 0.79% (241) from other races, and 1.97% (598) from two or more races. Hispanic or Latino of any race were 4.92% (1,492) of the population.

Of the 10,566 households, 43.1% had children under the age of 18; 68.0% were married couples living together; 7.5% had a female householder with no husband present and 22.4% were non-families. Of all households, 19.2% were made up of individuals and 9.8% had someone living alone who was 65 years of age or older. The average household size was 2.85 and the average family size was 3.31.

30.0% of the population were under the age of 18, 4.7% from 18 to 24, 22.5% from 25 to 44, 29.7% from 45 to 64, and 13.1% who were 65 years of age or older. The median age was 41.0 years. For every 100 females, the population had 92.7 males. For every 100 females ages 18 and older there were 87.2 males.

The Census Bureau's 2006–2010 American Community Survey showed that (in 2010 inflation-adjusted dollars) median household income was $127,799 (with a margin of error of +/− $10,580) and the median family income was $150,797 (+/− $11,480). Males had a median income of $111,762 (+/− $7,767) versus $71,217 (+/− $5,624) for females. The per capita income for the town was $63,498 (+/− $4,577). About 0.9% of families and 2.3% of the population were below the poverty line, including 2.4% of those under age 18 and 2.0% of those age 65 or over.

=== 2000 census ===
As of the 2000 United States census there were 29,644 people, 10,622 households, and 8,178 families residing in the town. The population density was 4,403.1 inhabitants per square mile (1,700.0/km^{2}). There were 10,819 housing units at an average density of 1,607.0 per square mile (620.5/km^{2}). The racial makeup of the town was 89.98% White, 3.88% African American, 0.09% Native American, 4.08% Asian, 0.01% Pacific Islander, 0.62% from other races, and 1.33% from two or more races. Hispanic or Latino of any race were 2.82% of the population.

There were 10,622 households, out of which 40.8% had children under the age of 18 living with them, 68.0% were married couples living together, 7.1% had a female householder with no husband present, and 23.0% were non-families. Of all households, 19.3% were made up of individuals, and 9.4% had someone living alone who was 65 years of age or older. The average household size was 2.77 and the average family size was 3.20.

In the town, the population was spread out, with 28.4% under the age of 18, 4.0% from 18 to 24, 29.6% from 25 to 44, 24.5% from 45 to 64, and 13.5% who were 65 years of age or older. The median age was 39 years. For every 100 females, there were 92.1 males. For every 100 females age 18 and over, there were 87.4 males.

The median income for a household in the town was $98,390, and the median income for a family was $112,145. Males had a median income of $82,420 versus $45,305 for females. The per capita income for the town was $47,187. About 1.7% of families and 2.7% of the population were below the poverty line, including 3.3% of those under age 18 and 3.1% of those age 65 or over.

== Government ==
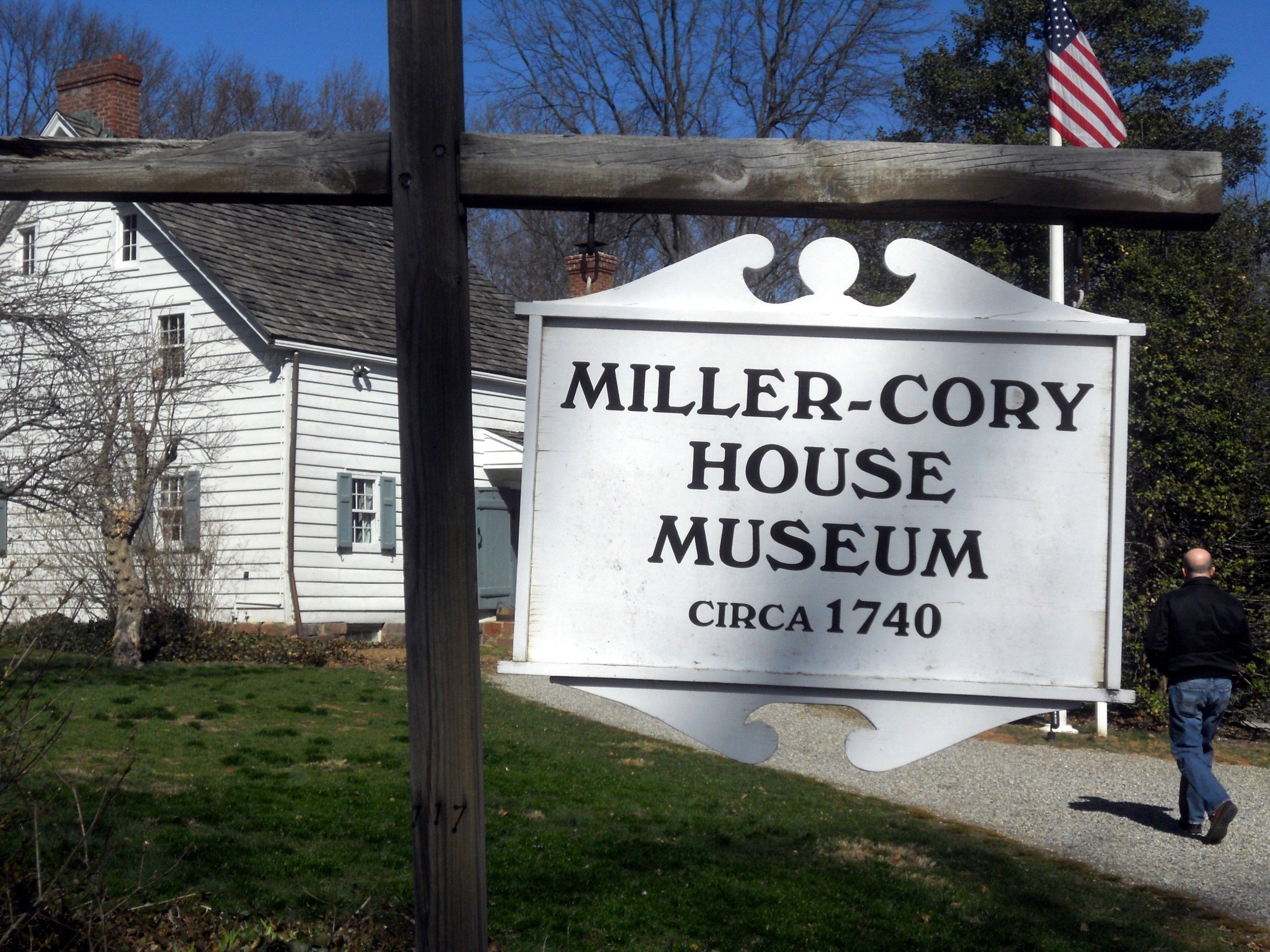
Miller-Cory House Museum

=== Local government ===
Westfield is governed under a special charter granted by an act of the New Jersey Legislature. The town is one of 11 municipalities (of the 564) statewide that operate under special charters. The governing body is comprised of a mayor and an eight-member Town Council, with all positions filled in partisan elections. The mayor is elected directly by the voters at-large to a four-year term of office. The Town Council consists of eight members, with two members elected from each of four wards. Town Council members are elected to serve four-year terms on a staggered basis, with one seat in each ward coming up for election every other year. The Town Council holds meetings every two weeks where it discusses legislation under consideration, and which are open to the public.

As of 2026, the mayor of Westfield is Democrat Jeremy Berman, whose term of office ends on December 31, 2029. Members of the Westfield Town Council are Reshma Adwar (Ward 1; D, 2029), Todd B. Saunders (Ward 1; R, 2027), Michael Armento (Ward 2; R, 2027), Vik Venkataraman (Ward 2; D, 2029), Michal D. Domogala (Ward 3; R, 2027), Jennifer Gilman (Ward 3; D, 2029), David Kiefer (Ward 4; D, 2027) and Drew Pecker (Ward 4; D, 2029).

==== Emergency services ====
===== Police =====
The Westfield Police Department (WPD) has provided police protection to the town since 1903. The chief of police is Christopher Battiloro, who was appointed to the position in December 2018, after serving for four months on an interim basis. The department operates a Patrol Division, Traffic Safety Bureau, Records Bureau, Detective Bureau and its own Emergency Services Unit. Westfield's Parking Services also falls under the jurisdiction of the WPD, and is responsible for monitoring parking and traffic safety within Westfield's Central Business District and near schools. The WPD also has a Law Enforcement Explorers Post, Post #90. Each division of the WPD operates different vehicles, most with a black-and-white paint scheme.

===== Fire =====
The Westfield Fire Department was formed in 1875 following a fire that destroyed a city block on East Broad Street. The WFD is a career department. There are four platoons of nine (a Battalion Chief, two Captains and six Firefighters) working a 24-/72-hour work schedule out of two fire stations. Administrative members include the Chief of Department, the Deputy Chief of Operations, and the Deputy Chief of Fire Prevention. The Fire Safety Inspector position in the Fire Prevention Bureau was eliminated in January 2009 due to budget cuts. The Chief of Department is Michael Duelks was sworn in on April 26, 2022 .

Westfield Fire Headquarters, located at 405 North Avenue West, is staffed 24 hours a day by a Battalion Chief (Shift Commander), a Captain and three firefighters. These personnel make up the engine company, first due on the north side of town, and the ladder company. A reserve engine company and a utility pick-up are also housed at fire headquarters. The office of the Chief of Department and the Deputy Chief of Operations are located here as well.

Station 2, located at 1029 Central Avenue, is staffed 24 hours a day by a Captain and two firefighters. These personnel make up the engine company, first due on the south side of town. A reserve engine company, a utility pick-up, and a spare SUV are also housed at Station 2. The Fire Prevention Bureau is located at Station 2 and houses the office of the Deputy Chief of Fire Prevention.

The WFD in operates a fleet of two E-One Engines (2 x 2,000 GPM) 2 Pierce Enforcer Engines (x2 2,000GM and 1 Pierce Arrow XT 100' Rearmount Ladder, one support SUV, and three staff 4x4 vehicles. The paint scheme (Ladder 1, Engines 2, 3 & 4) being red bodies with white cabs. Engine 5 is a full deep red. The support vehicles, a Ford Pick-Up (Utility 7), a Chevy Pick-Up (Utility 8), are red with white striping and a Ford Expedition (Car 9), Ford Exploerer (Car 11) and Ford Maverick (Truck 10) white with thin redline motifs. The remaining staff vehicles, for Chief Officers, are an unmarked Chevy Tahoes.

The WFD responds annually to approximately 2,000 calls for service. The WFD serves as a backup EMS agency for the town if the Westfield Volunteer Rescue Squad is not readily available. All members are CPR-Defib certified and New Jersey certified EMTs. Both stations are staffed with FF/EMTs 24 hours a day.

The WFD is also a partner in the Union County Fire Mutual Aid agreement, responding to numerous requests for aid to any of the other 20 municipalities in Union County.

The career firefighters (excluding the Chief and Deputy Chiefs) are members of New Jersey Firefighter's Mutual Benevolent Association (NJ FMBA) Local 30.

===== Rescue squad =====
The Westfield Volunteer Rescue Squad is staffed around the clock by volunteer certified EMTs. Shifts range from 5 hours in the morning and afternoon to 14 hours overnight. The Squad has three ambulances with a crew every shift. Members are paged in the event that another emergency arises and the original crew is answering a medical call. Dispatchers are also volunteers, answering phones directly from the police line.

=== Federal, state and county representation ===
Westfield is located in the 7th Congressional District and is part of New Jersey's 21st state legislative district.

For the 119th United States Congress, New Jersey's 7th congressional district is represented by Thomas Kean Jr. (R, Westfield). New Jersey is represented in the United States Senate by Democrats Cory Booker (Newark, term ends 2027) and Andy Kim (Moorestown, term ends 2031).

For the 2026–2027 session, the 21st legislative district of the New Jersey Legislature is represented in the State Senate by Jon Bramnick (R, Westfield) and in the General Assembly by Vincent Kearney (D, Garwood) and Andrew Macurdy (D, Summit).

Union County is governed by a Board of County Commissioners, whose nine members are elected at-large to three-year terms of office on a staggered basis with three seats coming up for election each year, with an appointed County Manager overseeing the day-to-day operations of the county. At an annual reorganization meeting held in the beginning of January, the board selects a Chair and Vice Chair from among its members. As of 2026, Union County's County Commissioners are:

Vice Chair Rebecca Williams (D, Plainfield, 2028), Chairman Joesph Bodek (D, Linden, 2026), James E. Baker Jr. (D, Rahway, 2027), Michele Delisfort (D, Union Township, 2026), Lourdes M. Leon (D, Elizabeth, 2026), Alexander Mirabella (D, Fanwood, 2027) Kimberly Palmieri-Mouded (D, Westfield, 2027). Stanley J. Neron (D, Elizabeth, 2028), Joseph Signorello III (D, Roselle Park, 2028)

Constitutional officers elected on a countywide basis are: Clerk Vacant - Incumbent Clerk Joanne Rajoppi (D, Union Township) died on July 16, 2026. Her death triggered a special election for a full five-year term to be held concurrently with the November 2026 general election. Deputy Clerk Clara Fernández assumes the powers of the office until the vacancy is filled. Sheriff Peter Corvelli (D, Kenilworth, 2026) and Surrogate Christopher E. Hudak (D, Clark, 2027).

=== Politics ===
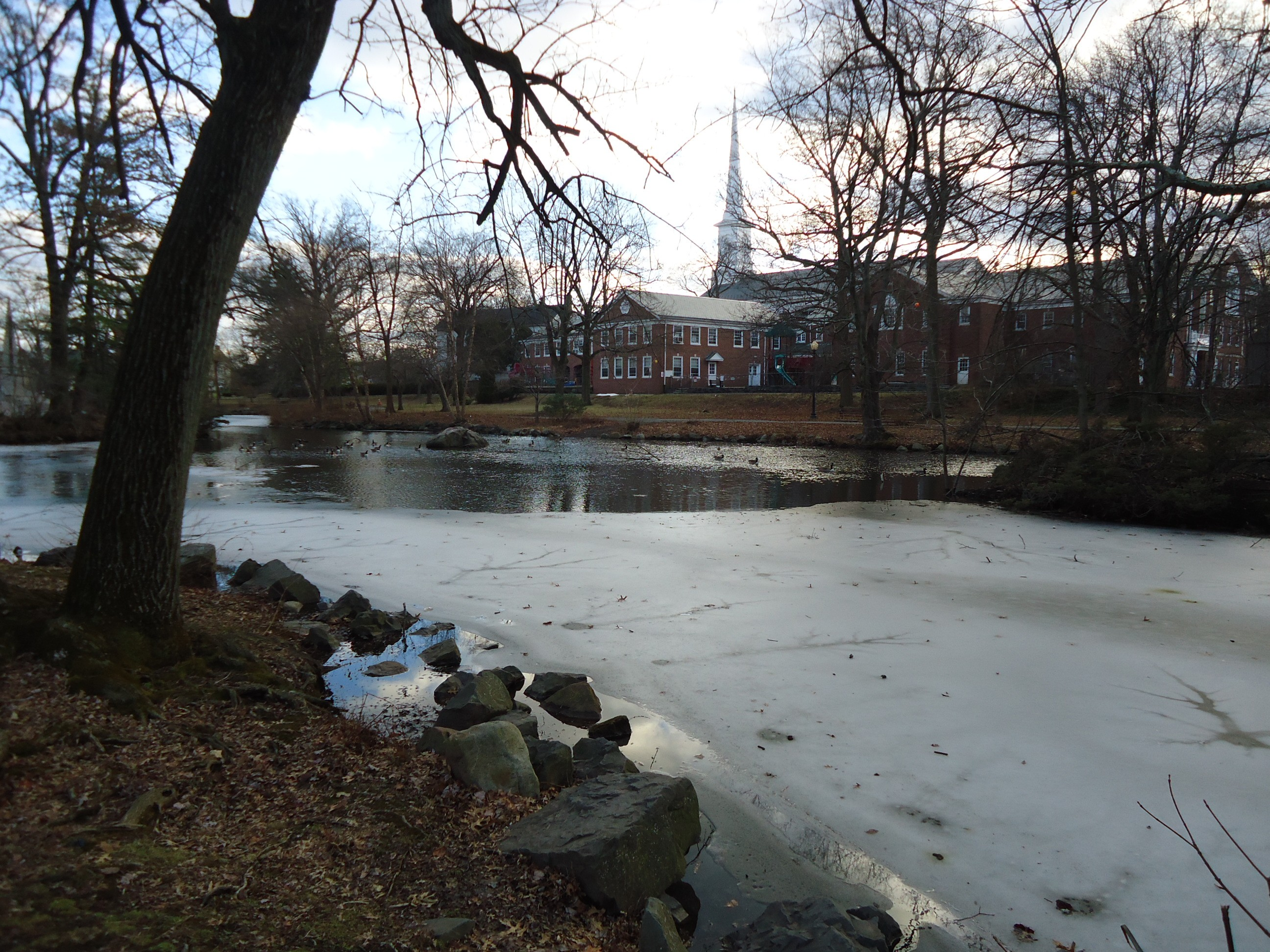
Presbyterian Church of Westfield as seen from Mindowaskin Park near the downtown area

As of March 2011, there were a total of 20,684 registered voters in Westfield, of which 6,485 (31.4% vs. 41.8% countywide) were registered as Democrats, 5,244 (25.4% vs. 15.3%) were registered as Republicans and 8,942 (43.2% vs. 42.9%) were registered as Unaffiliated. There were 13 voters registered as either Libertarians or Greens. Among the town's 2010 Census population, 68.2% (vs. 53.3% in Union County) were registered to vote, including 97.5% of those ages 18 and over (vs. 70.6% countywide).

United States presidential election results for Westfield
Year	Republican		Democratic		Third party(ies)	
Year	No.	%	No.	%	No.	%
2024	6,417	34.84%	11,667	63.35%	333	1.81%
2020	6,216	32.68%	12,550	65.97%	257	1.35%
2016	5,824	35.64%	9,954	60.91%	565	3.46%
2012	7,555	47.87%	8,080	51.20%	147	0.93%
2008	7,541	44.25%	9,345	54.84%	154	0.90%
2004	8,037	48.45%	8,442	50.89%	110	0.66%

In the 2012 presidential election, Democrat Barack Obama received 8,080 votes (50.9% vs. 66.0% countywide), ahead of Republican Mitt Romney with 7,555 votes (47.6% vs. 32.3%) and other candidates with 147 votes (0.9% vs. 0.8%), among the 15,866 ballots cast by the town's 21,797 registered voters, for a turnout of 72.8% (vs. 68.8% in Union County). In the 2008 presidential election, Democrat Barack Obama received 9,345 votes (54.5% vs. 63.1% countywide), ahead of Republican John McCain with 7,541 votes (44.0% vs. 35.2%) and other candidates with 154 votes (0.9% vs. 0.9%), among the 17,141 ballots cast by the town's 21,251 registered voters, for a turnout of 80.7% (vs. 74.7% in Union County). In the 2004 presidential election, Democrat John Kerry received 8,442 votes (50.6% vs. 58.3% countywide), ahead of Republican George W. Bush with 8,037 votes (48.2% vs. 40.3%) and other candidates with 110 votes (0.7% vs. 0.7%), among the 16,683 ballots cast by the town's 20,441 registered voters, for a turnout of 81.6% (vs. 72.3% in the whole county).

Gubernatorial election results for Westfield
Year	Republican		Democratic		Third party(ies)	
Year	No.	%	No.	%	No.	%
2025	5,845	37.95%	9,509	61.73%	49	0.32%
2021	5,364	40.98%	7,647	58.42%	78	0.60%
2017	4,978	42.77%	6,491	55.76%	171	1.47%
2013	6,303	64.13%	3,394	34.53%	131	1.33%
2009	6,070	51.42%	4,776	40.46%	958	8.12%
2005	5,705	47.77%	5,936	49.70%	302	2.53%

In the 2017 gubernatorial election, Democrat Phil Murphy received 6,491 votes (55.8% vs. 65.2% countywide), ahead of Republican Kim Guadagno with 4,978 votes (42.8% vs. 32.6%), and other candidates with 171 votes (1.5% vs. 2.1%), among the 12,007 ballots cast by the town's 22,504 registered voters, for a turnout of 53.4%. In the 2013 gubernatorial election, Republican Chris Christie received 64.1% of the vote (6,303 cast), ahead of Democrat Barbara Buono with 34.5% (3,394 votes), and other candidates with 1.3% (131 votes), among the 10,053 ballots cast by the town's 21,513 registered voters (225 ballots were spoiled), for a turnout of 46.7%. In the 2009 gubernatorial election, Republican Chris Christie received 6,070 votes (51.0% vs. 41.7% countywide), ahead of Democrat Jon Corzine with 4,776 votes (40.2% vs. 50.6%), Independent Chris Daggett with 900 votes (7.6% vs. 5.9%) and other candidates with 58 votes (0.5% vs. 0.8%), among the 11,893 ballots cast by the town's 20,982 registered voters, yielding a 56.7% turnout (vs. 46.5% in the county).

United States Senate election results for Westfield1
Year	Republican		Democratic		Third party(ies)	
Year	No.	%	No.	%	No.	%
2024	6,788	37.61%	11,034	61.14%	225	1.25%
2018	4,856	44.23%	5,809	52.91%	313	2.85%
2012	6,944	47.51%	7,393	50.58%	280	1.92%
2006	5,846	50.72%	5,485	47.58%	196	1.70%

United States Senate election results for Westfield2
Year	Republican		Democratic		Third party(ies)	
Year	No.	%	No.	%	No.	%
2020	6,994	37.08%	11,677	61.91%	189	1.00%
2014	3,638	45.91%	4,162	52.52%	124	1.56%
2013	2,652	42.49%	3,551	56.90%	38	0.61%
2008	7,686	49.06%	7,698	49.14%	282	1.80%

== Education ==
Public school students in pre-kindergarten through twelfth grades attend the Westfield Public Schools. As of the 2023–24 school year, the district, comprised of 10 schools, had an enrollment of 5,979 students and 498.1 classroom teachers (on an FTE basis), for a student–teacher ratio of 12.0:1. The district has a central kindergarten, six neighborhood elementary schools (grades 1-5), two middle schools (grades 6-8) divided by a "North Side / South Side" boundary, and one high school (grades 9-12). The schools in the district (with 2023–24 enrollment data from the National Center for Education Statistics) are Lincoln Early Childhood Center (with 260 students; in grades PreK-K), Franklin Elementary School (531; 1-5 - North), Jefferson Elementary School (472; 1-5 - South), McKinley Elementary School (309; 1-5 - South), Tamaques Elementary School (444; 1-5 - South), Washington Elementary School (289; 1-5 - North), Wilson Elementary School (349; 1-5 - North), Thomas Alva Edison Intermediate School (774; 6-8 - South), Roosevelt Intermediate School (668; 6-8 - North) and Westfield High School (1,784; 9-12).

For high school, public school students from Westfield and all of Union County are eligible to apply to attend the Union County Vocational Technical Schools, which include Union County Magnet High School, Union County Academy for Information Technology, Union County Academy for Allied Health Sciences, Union County Vocational Technical High School and Union County Academy for Performing Arts.

Holy Trinity School is a Middle States-accredited Catholic school run by the three parishes of Holy Trinity and St. Helen's in Westfield along with Our Lady of Lourdes in Mountainside, which offers education from pre-kindergarten to 8th grade and operates under the auspices of the Roman Catholic Archdiocese of Newark.

== Transportation ==
=== Roads and highways ===
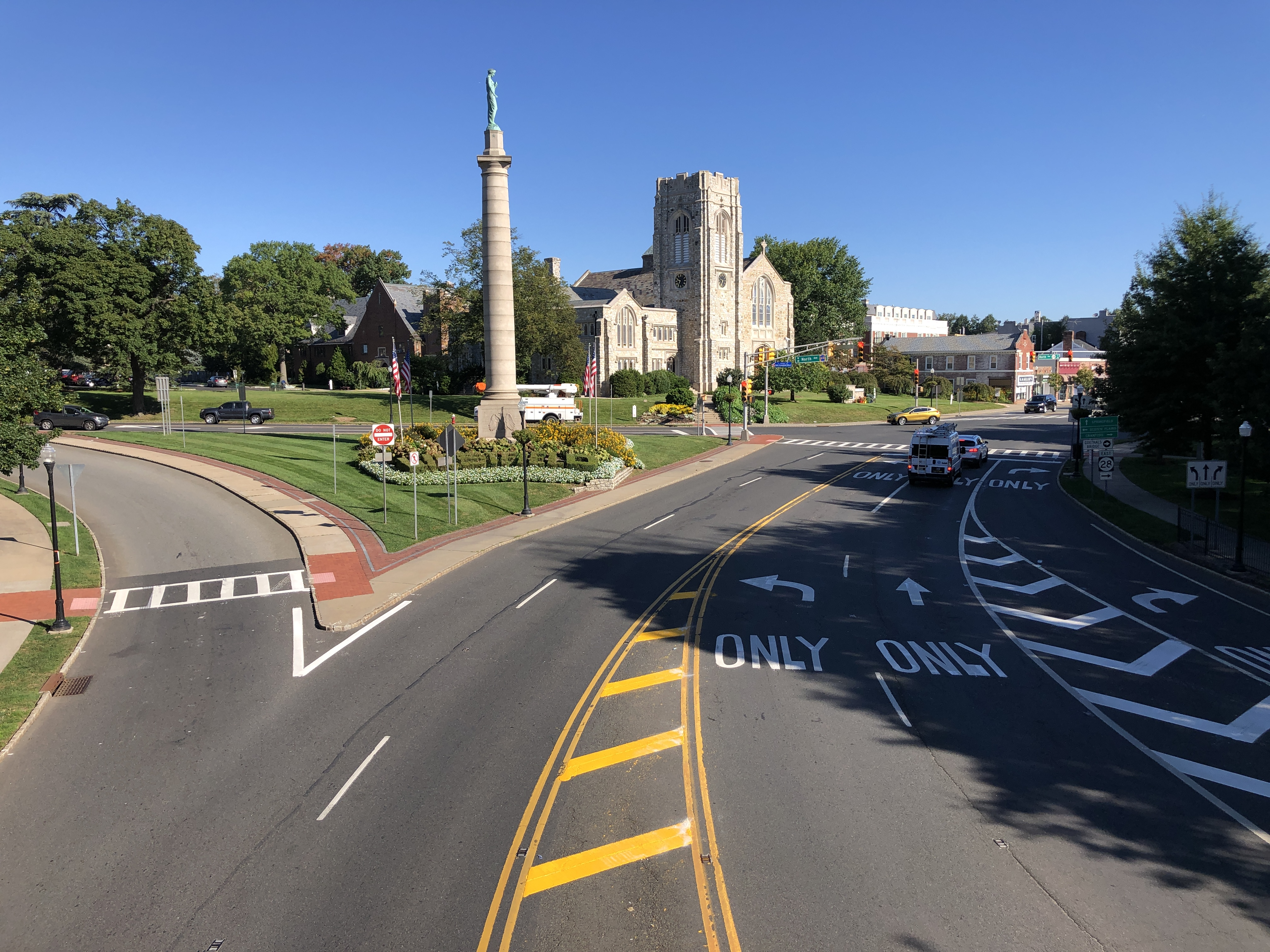
Route 28 eastbound, County Route 509 northbound and CR 610 westbound through Westfield

As of May 2010, the town had a total of 108.63 miles (174.82 km) of roadways, of which 96.69 miles (155.61 km) were maintained by the municipality, 9.94 miles (16.00 km) by Union County and 2.00 miles (3.22 km) by the New Jersey Department of Transportation.

The main road serving Westfield is Route 28, which runs for about two miles alongside the commuter railroad that marks the boundary between the town's North and South Sides. Westfield can also be accessed by Exits 135 and 137 of the nearby Garden State Parkway, or by the Lawrence, Mountain, or Springfield Avenue exits of U.S. Route 22.

=== Public transportation ===
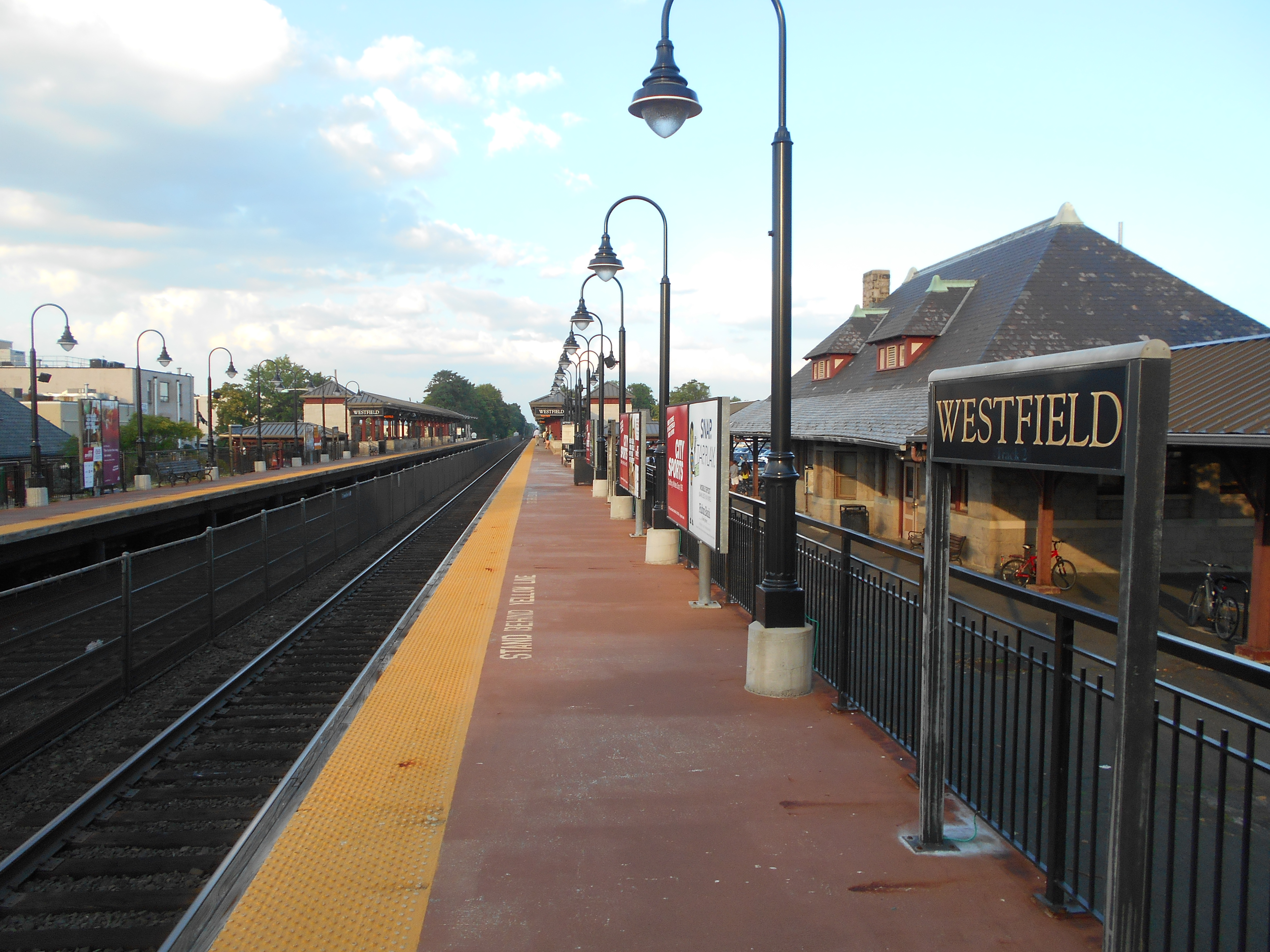
Westfield Station

NJ Transit (NJT) provides passenger rail service from the Westfield train station. Commuter rail service is offered on the Raritan Valley Line to Newark Penn Station with connecting service to New York Penn Station. Westfield riders are able to make a one-seat ride (no transfer necessary) into NY Penn Station during weekday off-peak hours, which was made possible by upgrades of the NJT train equipment to operate into New York City. Westfield's position and schedule on the Raritan Valley Line make it desirable for commuters, as several times in the morning and evening rush hours a non-stop service operates to/from Newark Penn Station. On these non-stop services, the one-way journey time to/from NY Penn Station is 50 minutes, or 20 minutes to/from Newark Penn Station.

The NJ Transit 113 bus route provides one-seat service to New York City's Port Authority Bus Terminal seven days per week from the town center, taking approximately one hour to NYC, with additional service available along Route 22 on the northern edge of the town (NJT bus routes 114 and 117), taking approximately 45 minutes. The 59 route provides local bus service between Plainfield and Newark.

Newark Liberty International Airport is approximately 20 minutes away, most conveniently reached via Route 22 or NJT trains. Linden Airport, a general aviation facility, is in nearby Linden, New Jersey.

== Services ==
Residential telephone service is provided by both Verizon Communications and Comcast. Westfield cable television is supplied by both Comcast , which also delivers Westfield Community Television (channel 36), News 12 New Jersey (channel 62), and Scotch Plains Local Access Channel (channel 34) Verizon FiOS is also offered in Westfield, which gives the option of digital cable, high-speed internet and telephone service. Power is supplied through the Public Service Electric and Gas Company. Gas is supplied by Elizabethtown Gas and water by American Water of New Jersey. Recycling is collected curbside by private haulers contracted by the Department of Public Works on a biweekly basis, while trash is collected by private haulers hired by residents.

== Media ==
Westfield is served by the locally published weekly newspaper, The Westfield Leader. The Record-Press had served the community until it ended publication in 2008. Westfield is also served by multi-community newspapers including the Courier News, a daily newspaper based in Bridgewater Township, and The Star-Ledger based in Newark. Westfield Patch is an online news source dedicated strictly to local Westfield news that is updated around the clock by a small staff of paid editors and volunteer contributors. Likewise, TAPInto Westfield is an online news source dedicated to local Westfield news.

Westfield + Cranford Local is a monthly magazine covering the two towns that launched in the early 2020s.

=== Westfield Community Television (WCT) ===
The local community access channel 36 operates out of the Municipal Building on Broad Street in Westfield on Mondays, Wednesdays, Fridays and half of every Sunday. WCT provides limited community-related programming, coverage of town council meetings, and operates the WCT Bulletin Board. WCT shares time on channel 36 with Blue Devil Television, which originates from Westfield High School and produces nearly 200 original productions each academic year.

== Culture ==
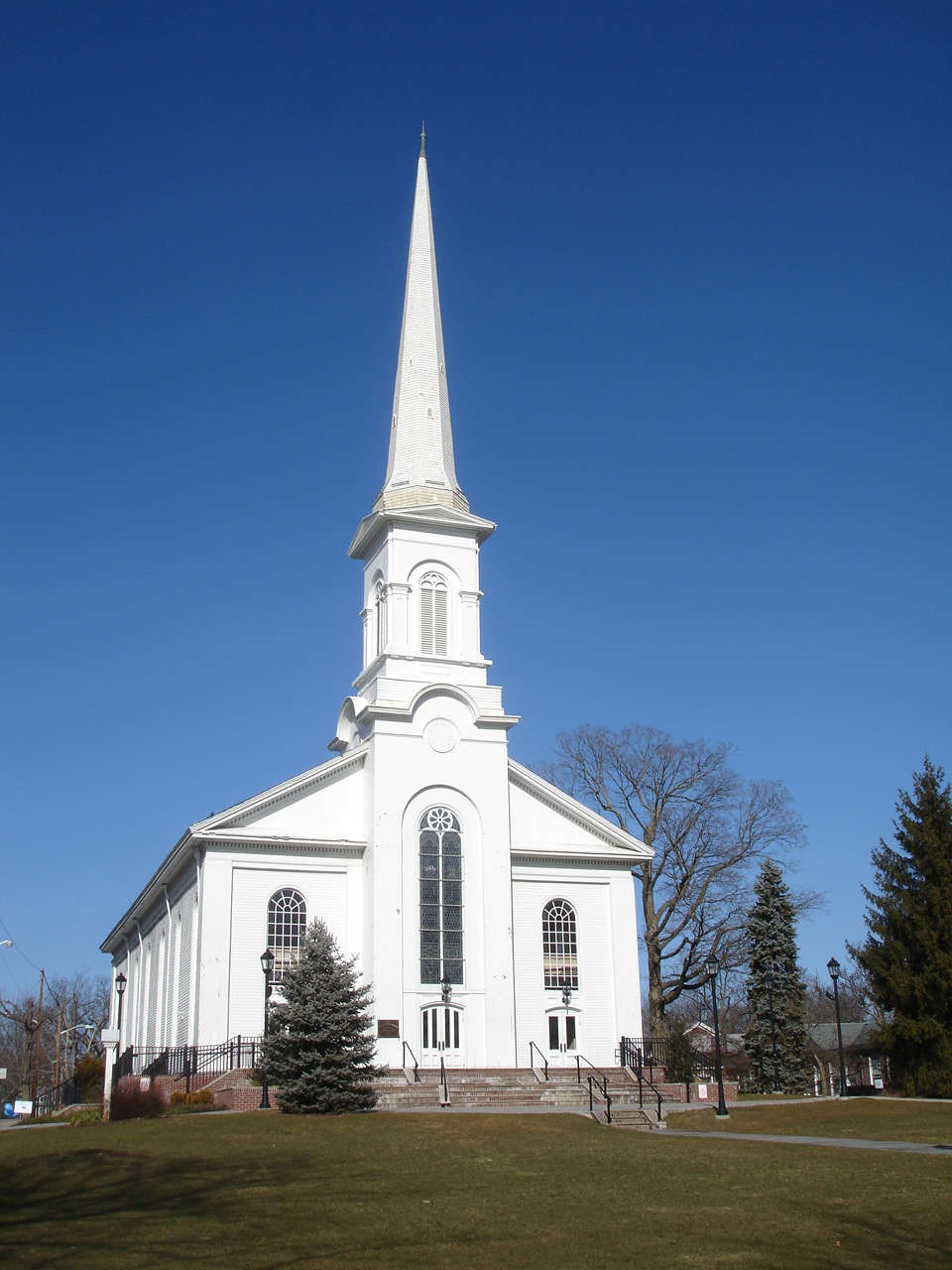
The Presbyterian congregation in Westfield, known simply as the Presbyterian Church, was established in 1728.

The Greek Orthodox Archdiocese of America Metropolis of New Jersey is headquartered in Westfield.

=== Houses of worship ===
The Presbyterian congregation in Westfield, the Presbyterian Church in Westfield, was established in 1728 as The Presbyterian Church in the West Fields of Elizabethtown and holds regular worship services and community ministry programs. The United Methodist congregation, First United Methodist Church of Westfield, traces its presence in the community back to at least 1859, with multiple building phases of its sanctuary over time; it conducts regular worship services and local mission initiatives.

The Episcopal parish, St. Paul’s Episcopal Church, was founded in 1867 and became known as St. Paul’s in 1894; it provides worship services and community activities and is affiliated with the Episcopal Diocese of New Jersey of the Episcopal Church.

The Roman Catholic parish Holy Trinity Roman Catholic Church was incorporated in 1872 and provides Mass and parish functions as part of the Roman Catholic Archdiocese of Newark. It is named for the Holy Trinity, the Christian belief in one God in three persons: the Father, the Son, and the Holy Spirit. A second Roman Catholic parish, St. Helen’s Roman Catholic Church, was established in 1968, with the permanent church building completed in the early 1970s. It is part of the Roman Catholic Archdiocese of Newark. It is named for Saint Helen, the mother of Constantine the Great.

The Lutheran congregation, Redeemer Lutheran Church, founded circa 1925, holds worship services and offers religious education and community ministries; it is affiliated with the Lutheran Church—Missouri Synod.

The Greek Orthodox parish Holy Trinity Greek Orthodox Church is affiliated with the Greek Orthodox Archdiocese of America and offers regular liturgical services and community programs. The United Church of Christ congregation First Congregational Church of Westfield holds regular worship services and outreach activities in the community. The Reform Jewish congregation Temple Emanu‑El, founded in 1950 by local families, provides worship services, religious education, and cultural programs.

== Notable people ==
People who were born in, residents of, or otherwise closely associated with Westfield include:

- Marc Acito (born 1966), playwright, novelist and humorist
- Charles Addams (1912–1988), cartoonist for The New Yorker magazine, most famous for his cartoons of The Addams Family
- Kim Alsop (born c. 1933), former head coach of the Samford Bulldogs football team
- Steve Angeli, American football quarterback for the Notre Dame Fighting Irish
- Charles E. Apgar (1865–1950), business executive and amateur radio operator best known for making early recordings of German radio transmissions at the start of World War I
- Virginia Apgar (1909–1974), creator of the Apgar score for assessing health of newborns
- Billy Ard (born 1959), former NFL guard for the New York Giants and Green Bay Packers
- H. W. Ambruster (1879–1961), football coach, chemical engineer, actor and lecturer
- Omar Ashmawy, staff director and chief counsel of the Office of Congressional Ethics
- Richard Bagger (born 1960), former mayor, who served as chief of staff for Governor of New Jersey Chris Christie
- Robert L. Barchi (born 1946), twentieth president of Rutgers University, 2012-2020
- Cheryl Barnes, singer and actress best known for her role in Miloš Forman's 1979 film adaptation of Hair, where she played the mother of Hud's little son
- Florence Hague Becker (1886–1971), 16th President General of the Daughters of the American Revolution
- Carolyn Beebe (1873–1950), pianist who was a founder of the New York Chamber Music Society
- Bryan Beller (born 1971), bass guitarist known for his work with Mike Keneally, Steve Vai, Dethklok, James LaBrie of Dream Theater and Dweezil Zappa
- Matt Bernstein (born 1998), internet personality and political commentator
- Jon Bramnick (born 1953), member of the New Jersey General Assembly who has represented the 21st Legislative District since 2003
- Brock Brower (1931–2014), novelist, magazine journalist and TV writer
- Dave Brown (born 1970), NFL quarterback who played for the New York Giants and Arizona Cardinals
- Steve Brozak (born 1961), Managing Partner and President of WBB Securities, LLC, a Democratic congressional candidate in the 2004 election cycle and the chairman and CEO of StormBio, Inc.
- Robert N. Buck (1914–2007), aviator and author who broke 14 junior airspeed records in the 1930s, started his flying career at the Westfield Airport
- Alan Bunce (1900–1965), radio and television actor
- Devin Caherly (born 2001, class of 2019), social media personality
- Chris Campbell (born 1954), wrestler who won a bronze medalist in Freestyle wrestling at the 1992 Summer Olympics
- Gil Chapman (born 1953), running back and return specialist for the University of Michigan and New Orleans Saints
- Steve Cheek (born 1977), NFL punter, 2001–2005 (San Francisco 49ers, Kansas City Chiefs, Carolina Panthers)
- Michael Chertoff (born 1953), United States Secretary of Homeland Security and former United States district court Judge
- John Chironna (1928–2010), head coach of the Rhode Island Rams football team in 1961 and 1962
- Chris Christie (born 1962), Governor of New Jersey, who lived in Westfield for a year while his home in Mendham was under construction
- Bob Clotworthy (1931–2018), diver who competed in the 3 m springboard at the 1952 and 1956 Olympics and won a bronze and a gold medal, respectively
- William Clotworthy (1926–2021), television censor and author, who was the primary censor for Saturday Night Live from 1979 to 1991
- Grover Connell (1918–2018), rice trader and longtime member of the Forbes 400
- Pat Cosquer (born 1975), college squash coach
- John Cuneo (born 1957), illustrator, whose work has appeared in The New Yorker, Esquire, Sports Illustrated and The Atlantic
- Nicholas Delpopolo (born 1989), judoka who has represented the United States at the 2012 Summer Olympics and 2016 Summer Olympics
- Robert S. Dietz (1914–1995), marine geologist, geophysicist and oceanographer who conducted pioneering research concerning seafloor spreading
- Tamecka Dixon (born 1975), former USA national team and WNBA player who played for the Los Angeles Sparks, Houston Comets and Indiana Fever
- Alexander Wilson Drake (1843–1916), artist, collector and critic
- Sara Driver (born 1955), independent filmmaker
- Michael DuHaime (born 1974), Republican strategist and public affairs executive
- Geoff Edwards (1931–2014), actor and game show host
- Edward Einhorn (born 1970), children's author, director and playwright
- Mike Emanuel (born 1967), Washington correspondent for Fox News
- Gail Falkenberg (born 1947), professional tennis player, who may be the oldest tournament tennis player of all time, having competed in ITF Women's World Tennis Tour tournaments as recently as 2021, at age 74
- Thomas Farley, pediatrician who served as the commissioner of the Philadelphia Department of Health
- Kevin Feige (born 1973), film producer and President of Marvel Studios
- Michael Fennelly (born 1949), rock guitarist, singer and songwriter who performed with The Millennium and Crabby Appleton
- Gerald Foster (1900–1987), painter who competed in the painting event in the art competition at the 1932 Summer Olympics
- William Chapman Foster (1897–1984), businessman and high-ranking government official who negotiated multiple arms control treaties
- Nona Garson (born 1958), equestrian who competed in team jumping and individual jumping at the 2000 Summer Olympics in Sydney
- GH057ayame (gamer tag of Eric Hewitt), retired professional Major League Gaming gamer who works for 343 Industries working on future Halo games
- Gina Glantz (born c. 1943), political strategist, campaign manager, field director and consultant
- John Duval Gluck (1878–1951), philanthropist, customs broker and con artist who is best known for popularizing the practice of sending and answering letters to Santa Claus in New York City
- Dan Graham (born 1942), artist, writer, and curator
- Joseph Greenspan (born 1992), soccer player for the Pittsburgh Riverhounds SC of the United Soccer League
- Robert Greifeld (born 1957), CEO of NASDAQ-OMX
- Matt Gutman (born 1977), ABC News correspondent
- Harry Hanan (1916–1982), cartoonist of the syndicated comic strip Louie
- Kenneth Hand (1899–1988), politician and judge who served in the New Jersey Senate
- Walt Hansgen (1919–1966), race car driver
- Chuck Hardwick (born 1941), politician and business leader who served as Speaker of the New Jersey General Assembly and was a candidate for Governor of New Jersey
- Langston Hughes (1902–1967), poet
- Clark Hulings (1922–2011), realist artist
- Zora Neale Hurston (1891–1960), folklorist
- Jared Isaacman (born 1983), entrepreneur, pilot, philanthropist and commercial astronaut
- Scott Jacobs (born 1958), painter known for his photorealistic work of Harley-Davidson motorcycles, who became the company's first official licensed artist in 1993
- Robert Kaplow (born 1954), teacher and novelist whose coming-of-age novel was made into a film titled Me and Orson Welles
- Thomas Kean Jr. (born 1968), U.S. Congressman, former Minority Leader of the New Jersey State Senate and New Jersey Assemblyman; son of former Governor of New Jersey Thomas Kean
- Mary Jo Keenen, actress who appeared on Nurses
- Kevin Kelly (born 1952), founder of Wired magazine
- Robert Kirsch (born 1966), United States district judge of the United States District Court for the District of New Jersey
- Martin Kunert (born 1970), film director and TV writer/producer of Voices of Iraq, MTV's Fear and Campfire Tales
- Christian J. Lambertsen (1917–2011), "the father of the Frogmen"
- Marilyn Lange (born 1952), Playboy Playmate for May 1974 and Playmate of the Year for 1975
- Margaret Carver Leighton (1896–1987), children's author
- Ira Lewis (1932–2015), actor and playwright, whose works included Chinese Coffee
- John List (1925–2008), murderer convicted in the deaths of his wife, mother and three children. Known as the "Boogeyman of Westfield"
- Matt Loughlin, sportscaster who is the radio play-by-play voice of the New Jersey Devils of the National Hockey League on WFAN
- Andrew McCarthy (born 1962), actor who appeared in Weekend at Bernie's and is currently starring in The Family
- Francis X. McDermott (1924–2011), American Republican politician and Westfield mayor who served in both houses of the New Jersey Legislature and was Senate President of New Jersey.

- Sy Montgomery (born 1958), naturalist, author and scriptwriter
- Patrick Morrisey (born 1967), elected as Governor of West Virginia in 2024
- Rebecca Morse (born 1992), ice hockey defender, currently playing for the Metropolitan Riveters of the National Women's Hockey League
- Laura Overdeck, entrepreneur and philanthropist who is the founder and president of Bedtime Math
- Bill Palatucci (born 1958), attorney who is a member of the Republican National Committee and the New Jersey Apportionment Commission, and led the selection of staff for the first presidential transition of Donald Trump
- John S. Penn (1926–2013), politician who represented the 16th Legislative District in the New Jersey General Assembly from 1984 to 1994
- Randolph Perkins (1871–1936), mayor of Westfield from 1903 to 1905, and represented New Jersey's 6th congressional district from 1921 to 1936
- Dave Perkowski (born 1947), former competition swimmer who represented the United States in the 100-meter breaststroke event at the 1968 Summer Olympics in Mexico City
- Arthur N. Pierson (1867–1957), businessman and politician who served as Speaker of the New Jersey General Assembly and President of the New Jersey Senate
- Anne Revere (1903-1990), actress who won the Academy Award for Best Supporting Actress for National Velvet and a Tony Award for her performance in Lillian Hellman's play Toys in the Attic in 1960
- Paul Robeson (1898–1976), athlete, actor, singer, political activist, NFL guard from 1920 to 1922 for the Akron Pros and Milwaukee Badgers
- Andrew K. Ruotolo (1952–1995), politician who served as the Union County, New Jersey, prosecutor
- John Rzeznik (born 1965), lead singer of the Goo Goo Dolls
- Bret Schundler (born 1959), former mayor of Jersey City and former New Jersey gubernatorial candidate
- Amos Scudder (1779–1856), architect and builder
- Ephraim Scudder (1819–1872), builder
- John Scudder (1815–1869), builder
- Coleen Sexton (born 1979), actress who made her Broadway debut at age 20 in Jekyll & Hyde in 2000
- Matthew Sklar (born 1973), Tony Award and Emmy Award-nominated composer of Broadway musicals The Prom, Elf the Musical, and The Wedding Singer
- Jessica St. Clair (born 1976), actress and improvisational comedian
- Dan Soucek (born 1969), North Carolina state senator
- Jeff Torborg (born 1941), MLB player and manager
- P. Roy Vagelos (born 1929), former chairman and CEO of Merck & Co.
- Vincent Willem van Gogh (1890–1978), nephew of Vincent van Gogh who advanced his uncle’s legacy by founding the Van Gogh Museum
- Jeffrey A. Warsh (born 1960), former member of the New Jersey General Assembly and Executive Director of NJ Transit
- Dave Weinstein (born 1988), appointed by Governor of New Jersey Chris Christie in 2016 to serve as the state's Chief Technology Officer
- Roger Welch (born 1946), conceptual artist
- Harrison A. Williams (1919–2001), U.S. Senator who was forced to resign in the face of expulsion due to his involvement in the Abscam case
- Malinda Williams (born 1975), actress
- Alfred M. Wolin (born 1932), former United States district judge of the United States District Court for the District of New Jersey
- Glen Everett Woolfenden (1930–2007), ornithologist, known for his long-term study of the Florida scrub jay population at Archbold Biological Station near Lake Placid, Florida
- Harold "Butch" Woolfolk (born 1960), NFL running back from 1982 to 1988 who played for the New York Giants, Houston Oilers and Detroit Lions

== Trivia ==
As recently as 2017, the Broaddus family living in Westfield received letters from a supposed stalker who referred to himself as "The Watcher," causing a national sensation. The Broaddus family's experience, along with the 1971 John List family murders that also occurred in Westfield, were later adapted into the 2022 Netflix series The Watcher.
