= Westfield Memorial Library =

Coordinates: 40.65656°N 74.34216°W

The Westfield Memorial Library is located at 550 East Broad Street, in Westfield, Union County, New Jersey, United States. It is the only public library in Westfield.

== Renovations ==
This library was renovated five years ago. The first floor has a large children's section and also an area just for teens. The second floor is aimed more for adults. There is a magazine section, with a seating area, there are computers that can be used by anyone, and there are tables and chairs set up for quiet studying. The complete non-fiction section is on the second floor, as well as newspapers and yearbooks from past years in Westfield. There are also community rooms. There are computers set up frequently around the campus, as well as free wireless internet.

== Funding ==
The "Friends of the Westfield Memorial Library" help share information about the library, and fund money for the library. The "friends" were founded over 30 years ago, and since then, have donated more than $850,000 to the library. The money is raised through the annual book sale that is held at the library, and from the donations of the members of the board and the library itself.
