= New Jersey Sports Writers Association =

The New Jersey Sports Writers Association (NJSWA) was founded in 1936. The 75th Anniversary Banquet was held on Sunday, January 30, 2011, at The Pines Manor, Edison, New Jersey.

In January of each year, the NJSWA inducts into its hall of fame and presents awards for the preceding calendar year to various athletes, coaches, team executives, and other sports celebrities who either reside in, were born in, or played sports in New Jersey.

The NJSWA awards an annual scholarship to a resident of New Jersey who is majoring in journalism or media at a four-year university or college in New Jersey.

== History ==
See footnote

== Awards ==
=== 1980–1989 awardees ===
1986

The 1986 awards were presented at the 51st Anniversary Banquet on February 1, 1987, at The Pines Manor, in Edison, N.J.

- Pro Rookie of the Year – Mike Loynd, pitcher, Texas Rangers
- College Player of the Year – Gordie Lockbaum, two-way, Holy Cross
- College Offensive Player of the Year – Gregg Rakoczy, center, Miami University
- College Defensive Player of the Year – Tyronne Stowe, linebacker, Rutgers University
- New Jersey College Athlete of the Year (female) – Debbie Daniel, tennis, Trenton State College
- New Jersey College Athlete of the Year (male) – Walter Briggs, quarterback, Montclair State
- Man of the Year – Frank Cashen, general manager, New York Mets
- Most Courageous Athlete – Jim Giglio, pitcher, Trenton State

=== 1990–1999 awardees ===
1992

The 1992 awards were presented at the 57th Anniversary Banquet on

- Meritorious Service Award – Florence K. Peragallo, retired associate director, NJSIAA

=== 2000–2009 awardees ===
2001

The 2001 awards were presented at the 66th Anniversary Banquet on Sunday, January 27, 2002, at The Pines Manor, in Edison, N.J.

- A.L. Manager of the Year – Tom Kelly, manager, Minnesota Twins
- Pitching Coach of the Year – Rick Peterson, Oakland A's (born in New Brunswick)
- Pro Cornerback of the Year – Troy Vincent, Philadelphia Eagles (born in Trenton; Thomas Edison State College)
- Pro Soccer Player of the Year – Tim Howard, North Brunswick Township H.S., MetroStars
- Pro Bowler of the Year – Carolyn Dorin-Ballard (born in Linden)
- MVP – Dave Kennedy, New Jersey Jackals, North League champions
- Minor League GM of the Year – Geoff Brown, Lakewood BlueClaws (SAL)
- College Pitcher of the Year – Robert Brownlie, Rutgers baseball
- Football Co-Player of the Year, NJAC – Ed Collins, quarterback, Montclair State University
- Football Co-Player of the Year, NJAC – Tony Racioppi, quarterback, Rowan University
- Distinguished Service to Hockey – Slava Fetisov, New Jersey Devils
- Golden Bat Award – Jorge Posada, New York Yankees
- Baseball Good Guy – Lee Mazzilli, New York Yankees
- Good Guy – Michael Barrows, linebacker, New York Giants
- Sports Humanitarian – Bobby Valentine, manager, New York Mets
- Most Courageous Athlete – Tim Howard, North Brunswick Township H.S., MetroStars

2002

The 2002 awards were presented at the 67th Anniversary Banquet on Sunday, February 2, 2003, at The Pines Manor, in Edison, New Jersey.

- Distinguished Service to Thoroughbred Racing – Robert Kulina, Monmouth Park's and Meadowlands general manager and vice president of Thoroughbred Racing

2003

The 2003 awards were presented at the 68th Anniversary Banquet on Sunday, January 24, 2004, at The Pines Manor, in Edison, New Jersey.

- Coaching Legends Award – Charles Brown, New Jersey City University men's basketball

2008

The 2008 awards were presented at the 73rd Anniversary Banquet on Sunday, January 25, 2009, at The Pines Manor, in Edison, New Jersey.

- Big East Conference Player of the Year – Mike Teel, Don Bosco Preparatory H.S., Rutgers football
- College Softball Coach of the Year – Anita Kubicka, Montclair State
- Sports Humanitarian of the Year – David Wright, New York Mets

2009

The 2009 awards were presented at the 74th Anniversary Banquet on Sunday, January 31, 2010, at The Pines Manor, in Edison, New Jersey.

- Man of the Year – Bob Hurley, basketball coach, St. Anthony (Jersey City)
- Woman of the Year – Christie Rampone, Point Pleasant Boro H.S., Monmouth University women's soccer, former captain of the U.S. World Cup Team, former player/coach of Sky Blue FC
- Team of the Year – Sky Blue FC (Somerset)
- Baseball Rookie of the Year – Rick Porcello, Seton Hall Prep, Detroit Tigers
- NFL Rookie of the Year – Kenny Britt, Bayonne, Rutgers football, Tennessee Titans
- College Men’s Basketball Player of the Year – Marqus Blakely, Metuchen H.S., University of Vermont
- College Women’s Basketball Player of the Year – Hillary Klimowicz, Scotch Plains-Fanwood H.S., The College of New Jersey
- College Football Player of the Year – Matt Szczur, Lower Cape May Regional H.S., Villanova
- College Coach of the Year – Al Golden, Red Bank Catholic H.S., Temple football
- Standardbred Racing Man of the Year – Steve Elliott (resident of Cream Ridge)
- Standardbred Racing Breeder of the Year – Ed Mullen (resident of Cream Ridge)
- Standardbred Racing Breeder of the Year – Mark Mullen (resident of Cream Ridge)
- Standardbred Racing Breeder of the Year – Steve Jones (resident of Cream Ridge)

=== 2010-2019 awardees ===
2010

The 2010 awards were presented at the 75th Anniversary Banquet on Sunday, January 30, 2011, at The Pines Manor, in Edison, New Jersey.

- Journalism Excellence – Frank Litsky, New York Times
- Radio-TV Excellence – Steve "The Schmoozer" Somers, WFAN 660
- Sports Woman of the Year – Anne Donovan, Paramus Catholic H.S., USA Olympian, Seton Hall women's basketball head coach
- Standardbred Horseman of the Year – Brian Sears, driver
- Women's Lacrosse College Player of the Year – Ali DeLuca, University of Pennsylvania
- College Running Back of the Year – Andrew Pierce, Delaware
- Women's College Coach of the Year – Courtney Banghart, Princeton women's basketball
- Sports Executive of the Year – David Fay, retired executive director, United States Golf Association
- New Jersey Coaching Legend – Bob Auriemma, Brick H.S. ice hockey
- Sports Humanitarian of the Year – Eddie Lucas, Yankeemagazine.com
- Eric LeGrand Courageous Athlete Award – Matt Hoffman, Rowan University

== Hall of fame ==
=== 2000-2009 inductees ===
2001

The 2001 inductees were inducted at the 66th Anniversary Banquet on Sunday, January 27, 2002, at The Pines Manor, in Edison, N.J.

- Randy Beverly, Wildwood H.S., New York Jets
- Chris Dailey, associate head coach, UConn women's basketball
- Tom Kelly, manager, Minnesota Twins (and 2001 A.L. Manager of the Year)
- Mike O'Koren, Hudson Catholic Regional H.S., University of North Carolina, New Jersey Nets
- Andre Tippett, Barringer H.S. (Newark), New England Patriots
- Willie Wilson, Summit H.S., Kansas City Royals

2003

The 2003 inductees were inducted at the 68th Anniversary Banquet on Sunday, January 24, 2004, at The Pines Manor, in Edison, New Jersey.

- Charles Brown, All-Hudson County basketball player, Lincoln H.S. (Jersey City); point guard, Jersey City State College (now New Jersey City University) (1962–65); teacher and middle-school principal, Jersey City Public School System (19 -1998); head coach, Lincoln H.S. (1966–81); men’s basketball coach, New Jersey City University (1982-2007) (and 2003 Coaching Legends Award)
- Bill Schutsky, Hillside H.S., Army men's basketball

2008

The 2008 inductees were inducted at the 73rd Anniversary Banquet on Sunday, January 25, 2009, at The Pines Manor, in Edison, New Jersey.

- Warren Wolf, football coach, Brick Township H.S.

2009

The 2009 inductees were inducted at the 74th Anniversary Banquet on Sunday, January 31, 2010, at The Pines Manor, in Edison, New Jersey.

- Lou Lamoriello, Devils CEO/President/GM

=== 2010-2019 inductees ===
2010

The 2010 inductees were to be inducted at the 75th Anniversary Banquet on Sunday, January 30, 2011, at The Pines Manor, in Edison, New Jersey.

- Bill Austin, 1958 All-American running back, Rutgers football
- Geoff Billet, Christian Brothers Academy (CBA); 1995-99 guard and assistant coach (2000), Rutgers men's basketball; assistant coach, Monmouth University and Seton Hall University; head coach, CBA (2007–present)
- Anne Donovan, Paramus Catholic H.S., USA Olympian, Seton Hall women's basketball head coach (and 2010 Sports Woman of the Year)
- David Fay, United States Golf Association (and 2010 Sports Executive of the Year)
- Fred Hill, Sr., head coach, Rutgers baseball
- Leonard Marshall, defensive lineman, New York Giants
- Eric Murdock, Bridgewater-Raritan H.S., Providence College All-American, NBA, Rutgers assistant coach, and Rutgers men’s basketball Director of Player Development
- Tasha Pointer, 1997-2001 point guard, 1998 Big East Rookie of the Year, 1999 and 2001 All–Big East first team, Big East 25th Anniversary Hall of Fame Team (2003), assistant coach (2007–present), Rutgers women's basketball

== Presidents ==
See footnote

- 1936 – Paul Horowitz, Newark Evening News
- 1937 – Ed Hill, Asbury Park Press
- 1938 – Art McMahon, Passaic Herald
- 1939–40 – Frank J. Fagan, Newark Star-Eagle
- 1941 – Bob Whiting, Paterson Morning Call
- 1942 – Gene Pinter, New Brunswick Home News
- 1943–45 – Sid Dorfman, Newark Star-Ledger
- 1946 – Louis Greenberg, Hudson Dispatch
- 1947 – Joe Lovas, Passaic Herald-News
- 1948 – Sam Siciliano, Asbury Park Press
- 1949–50 – George Lucas, Paterson Morning Call
- 1951 – Louis "Bud" Bauman, Elizabeth Journal
- 1952–54 – Joe McLaughlin, Newark Evening News
- 1955–56 – Carl Martin, Hudson Dispatch
- 1957 – Herb Nebel, Paterson Morning Call
- 1958–60 – Herb Stutz, Newark Evening News
- 1961–62 – Joe Lee, Asbury Park Press
- 1963–78 – Ed Nicheterlein, Atlantic City Press
- 1978–84 – Chuck Triblehorn, Red Bank Register
- 1984–90 – Joe Logue, The Trentonian
- 1990– (incl 2001) – Emery Konick Jr., The Home News Tribune
- (incl 2010)–present – George O'Gorman, The Trentonian

== See also ==
- New Jersey § Sports
- National Sports Media Association (NSMA)
- New York State Sportswriters Association
- Philadelphia Sports Writers Association
