= Tony Vega (jockey) =

Puerto Rican American Thoroughbred jockey and community activist

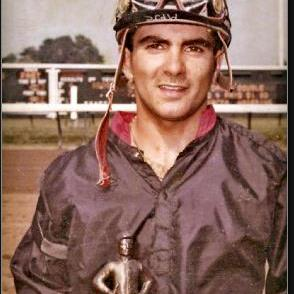

Personal information
- Born: April 21, 1961 New Brunswick, New Jersey, United States
- Died: November 11, 2013 (aged 52) New Brunswick, New Jersey, United States
- Occupation: Jockey

Horse racing career
- Sport: Horse racing
- Career wins: 713

Major racing wins
- The Iroquois Handicap 1983 (Keystone Park) The Grantville stakes (Penn National) 1983 The Tosmah stakes 1983 (Monmouth Park) The Mayfair stakes 1983 (Keystone Park) The Hit It Rich stakes 1984 (Keystone Park) All American Handicap (Garden State Park)  (1985)Ambassador of Luck Handicap (Monmouth Park) (1985)Philadelphia Handicap (Garden State Park) (1985)Ashley T. Cole Handicap (Aqueduct Racetrack) (1988)Martha Washington Handicap (Laurel Park) (1988) The World Appeal stakes (Meadowlands Racetrack) 1993

Racing awards
- New Jersey Racing Writers "Apprentice Jockey of The Year" (1983) New Jersey Sports Writers Association "Pro Rookie of The Year" 1984 (First jockey ever to win award) Philadelphia Sportswriters Awards "Outstanding Amateur Athlete of The Year" 1984

Honors
- Champion jockey at Keystone Park - 1983 Champion jockey at Monmouth Park - 1983 Champion Apprentice for wins in U.S. 1983 Eclipse Award (Apprentice jockey) runner up -1984 Honored as Thoroughbred Racings representative - The Philadelphia Sportswriters Awards - 1984

Significant horses
- Evzone, Precisionist, Timely Business
- Updated on February 13, 2021

Antonio "Tony" Vega (April 21, 1961 – November 11, 2013) was a Puerto Rican American Thoroughbred jockey and community activist from New Brunswick, New Jersey. He was a graded stakes winning, three-time champion jockey who competed in North American horse racing from 1982 to 2012.

In 1983, he was the top apprentice jockey in the U.S. for wins, and was second in the nation for earnings with over $2 million in purse money. As an apprentice, Vega won back to back riding titles at the (Keystone Park Winter-Spring meet (55 wins) & Monmouth Park Racetrack (134 wins), the first rider in Monmouth Park history to win 100 races in a season, the first apprentice jockey to win the riding title at Monmouth, the first jockey to lead the standings at three different racetracks at the same time (Keystone Park, Monmouth Park, Meadowlands Racetrack), and the first jockey to win six races in one day at Monmouth. Vega also broke twenty records that year, and became the first jockey to win the New Jersey Sports Writers Association's "Pro Rookie of The Year" award, along with being awarded the 1983 New Jersey Racing Writers "Apprentice Jockey of The Year" and being honored as Thoroughbred racing's representative at the 18th annual Philadelphia Sports Writers Association's awards ceremony. He finished second that year in the voting for the Eclipse Award for Outstanding Apprentice Jockey, and was ranked 7th overall for wins in the U.S. and 29th on the list for earnings.

Tony Vega had never landed any mounts in any of the U.S. Triple Crown or Breeders' Cup races but did compete in some of America's most prestigious graded stakes events in American horse racing during his time.

== Early life ==
Vega was born in New Brunswick, New Jersey to Carmen and Pedro Vega, who moved to New Jersey from Puerto Rico in the 1950s. Tony Vega was a top wrestler at New Brunswick High School in the late 1970s and a champion amateur boxer before becoming a jockey. He did not have a racing background and had planned to become a professional boxer before he started his professional riding career in 1982.

Vega trained under Martin L. "Marty" Fallon at Pennsylvania's Keystone Racetrack.

Vega was also a self-taught martial arts student who studied Jeet Kune Do, an eclectic hybrid martial art, heavily influenced by the philosophy of Bruce Lee. He was very active in the community and is remembered as tough, tiny, but tenacious kid who knew nothing about horse racing or becoming a jockey, until the day he met liquor salesman at the Uptown Cafe in New Brunswick. Vega shined shoes and worked as a dishwasher at the pub where one day, On the first Saturday in May, fans packed the pub to watch legendary jockey Angel Cordero Jr. guide Bold Forbes to victory in the 1976 Kentucky Derby. Vega made an idle boast while watching Cordero celebrate after his derby victory saying, "I could be just as good as him if I had the chance". A liquor salesman overheard him and took him seriously, introducing Vega to trainer Marty Fallon, who was known for bringing up young contract riders and teaching them everything there was to know about being a horseman before he allowed them to gallop horses in the morning and then become jockeys.

== Career ==
=== 1980s ===
Vega won his first race aboard Laudo at Philadelphia Park in Pennsylvania (now known as Parx Casino and Racing) on April 12, 1982, before going on a tear and winning 55 races en route to winning his first riding title during Keystone's winter-spring meet in 1983. Vega then moved his tack to New Jersey, taking Monmouth Park by storm. He became the winningest rider in Monmouth Park with 134 wins in a season, surpassing Don MacBeth's mark of 99 wins in a season, and breaking Jimmy Edwards record of 123 victories in a season established during an extended meet in 1975.

Vega became the first apprentice jockey ever to win Monmouth's riding title and, the first jockey to win 100 races in a single meet. Vega also won six races in a day on May 18, 1983 (five wins at Monmouth and one at Atlantic City Race Course later that night, and five races in a day twice in 1983. He was one of the first ever to do so. Vega also won three or more races in a day at Monmouth more than twenty times that summer, something that had only been done three times before.

In 1983, the Philadelphia Inquirer described Vega as the "leading apprentice" at Pennsylvania's Keystone Racetrack. He had the most wins of any apprentice jockey in the U.S., and was second in the nation for earnings. Vega finished 7th in the "U.S. Top 100" jockey standings for wins that year, and by the end of the season, finished second in the Eclipse Awards voting for "Outstanding Apprentice Jockey of The Year", edged for the national award in a split decision to Declan Murphy.

Vega was honored as Thoroughbred Racing's representative at the 18th annual Philadelphia Sportswriters Association's awards, won the 1983 New Jersey Racing Writers "Apprentice Jockey Of The Year" award and, the 1984 New Jersey Sports Writers Association's "Pro Rookie of The Year" award, becoming the first jockey ever to win the award.

In 1984, after winning back-to-back riding titles and breaking twenty records as an apprentice, Vega began his career as a journeyman and one of the most promising jockeys in the nation. He was the leading jockey at Keystone Park for part of the meet before he moving his tack to Maryland after his falling out with his mentor, trainer Marty L. Fallon. Vega also had constant issues with the Monmouth Park Racetrack stewards, and felt that he was being targeted by Sam Boulmetis Sr., because of his reputation off of the racetrack.

In addition to his success as a jockey, Vega was known for his competitive demeanor and physical riding style. During his teenage years, he was nicknamed "The Baby Animal" because of his size and attitude, while on the racetrack he was referred to as "Tony Vee, The Honey Bee," a nickname inspired by Muhammad Ali's phrase "Float like a butterfly, sting like a bee." Vega was a well-known figure on East Coast racetracks and was recognized for his finishing ability during races. He won many of his races aboard long shots and lower-tier horses, despite infrequently riding stakes-caliber mounts.

In 1985, Garden State Park Racetrack re-opened, and Vega, who was also riding regularly at Bowie Racetrack, Timonium, Laurel, and Pimlico, began working double duty and driving back and forth to New Jersey to ride at Atlantic City, the Meadowlands, and Garden State Park at night. He did this after working horses in the mornings, and riding races during the afternoon in Maryland, and on certain day's driving to New Jersey to ride the night cards. Vega won races at every track that he competed at that year.

Although his business had slowed down, Vega continued to win races at a steady clip and made the best of every opportunity presented to him. On June 17, 1985, Vega was called on to replace veteran Jockey Craig Perret on a mare named Forest Maiden at Garden State Park Racetrack. Vega and Forest Maiden went on to win the race that night in impressive fashion. On June 22, 1985, Vega was named back on Forest Maiden and scored another victory on the mare, squeezing through on the rail for a come from behind victory in the "Ambassador of Luck Handicap" at Monmouth Park Racetrack in New Jersey.

After winning several races aboard Forest Maiden, and several other horses for trainer Joe Pierce, Vega was named on a horse named Evzone in the first running of the All American Handicap at Garden State Park. Vega and Evzone went on to win, establishing a new track record in the process by finishing the 1 1/16 mile turf race in 1:41 4/5 seconds.

On July 13, 1985, Vega scored his third victory aboard Forest Maiden in the first running of the 1 1/16 mile Philadelphia Handicap at Garden State Park, finishing the race in 1:42 1/5 seconds. His success on the racetrack continued until the passing of his younger brother, Reynaldo Vega, who was only 24 years old at the time, which forced him to eventually quit riding at the peak of his career to take care of his family.

In 1988, Vega returned to the saddle at Calder Race Course in Florida, before moving his tack to New York to compete against a riding colony which included some of the best jockeys in the country. Days before opening day at Aqueduct Racetrack, the New York jockeys decided to go on strike after fellow jockey Mike Venezia was killed during a racing accident at Belmont Park. Vega rode and won at Aqueduct during the strike.

Riding against the strike upset several of the country's top riders including Jerry Bailey, Jean Cruget, Jorge Velásquez and other's, but by riding during the strike, Vega picked up mounts that gave him the two biggest wins of his career. Vega won the 1988 Ashley T. Cole Handicap aboard Tinchens Prince by a nose in dramatic fashion for owner Albert Fried, and the Grade 3 Martha Washington aboard Timely Business. Vega also won an allowance race during the strike on a filly named Timely Business, and was asked by trainer John O. Hertler to ride the filly back, because he'd never seen the horse respond to a rider the way she did when Vega rode her.

On November 12, 1988, Vega decided to take off all of his other mounts that he was scheduled to ride that day, and flew to Laurel Park in Maryland with trainer John O. Hertler to ride just one race aboard Timely Business. Timely Business was an unaccomplished filly who had just came back off a layoff due to a fracture, and was entered in the 1988 Martha Washington Handicap at Laurel Park after her impressive allowance victory at Aqueduct two weeks prior. Another jockey who rode in The Martha Washington was Hall of Fame Jockey Jean Cruget, best known for winning the Triple Crown aboard Seattle Slew. Cruget tried to intimidate Vega in the jockey's room before the race, but Vega did not back down and had the last word by winning the race easily, paying $58 to win. Other prominent riders who rode in the race were Hall of Fame jockeys Julie Krone and Kent Desormeaux.

=== 1990s ===
In the early 1990s, Vega teamed up with trainer Gene Lotti and had a great run up and down the East coast, winning races wherever they competed.

In 1993, Vega picked up a mount named Shanannies Boss, who was a tough, and rambunctious chestnut horse who liked to run off with riders in the mornings during training. That was until Vega began to gallop him in the mornings. Vega made a deal with owner Frank Generazio, that he would tame the horse and help get him ready for the races, only if he would be allowed to ride him come race time. Vega went on to win "The World Appeal Stakes" at Meadowlands Racetrack (October 9, 1993) for owner and trainer Patricia and Frank Generazio.

After Vega's last winning season in 1993, he gradually moved away from the racetrack, riding occasionally to stay in shape, and to please his wife, children, and fans who had always encouraged Vega to continue riding.

=== 2000s ===
Vega made several comebacks, winning at Atlantic City Racecourse in 1996, at Garden State Park in 1998, and in 2005 at Monmouth Park (NJ), and at Aqueduct Racetrack (NY).

Vega won several races before he stopped riding to take care of his family, and spend more time with his children.

In 2010, Tony Vega launched his final comeback and had a few heartbreaking losses, before coming back to win, and visit the winners circle for the last time at Monmouth Park on July 4, 2010, aboard Machismo for trainer Andrew Amonte. It was a special win for the Vega family as, Tony Vega's two son's worked with Machismo in the mornings, along with former jockey, and close friend of Vega's, Andy Amonte (Trainer of Machismo) and his son, who ran the family operation in New Jersey, and claimed/ trained Machismo during Monmouth Park Racetrack's Summer Elite Meet in 2010. Tony Vega was Machismo's regular exercise rider in the mornings leading up to his huge upset victory that day.

On the morning of November 11, 2013 (Veterans Day), while preparing for work, Vega suffered a heart attack and died in his home in New Jersey.

== Notable horses ==
- Precisionist (1985 Breeder Cup Sprint Champion, Eclipse Award winner who was inducted into the National Museum of Racing Hall of Fame)
- Evzone (Set a new course record in the 1985 All American Handicap at Garden State Park)
- Teddy Drone (Multiple Graded Stakes placed older horse who, was a fan favorite and, has a race run in his honor “The Teddy Drone Stakes” every summer at Monmouth Park)
- Timely Business (Won The 1988 Gr.3 Martha Washington Handicap)
- Traskwood (Top NY Bred who has a Stakes race run in his name every year at Aqueduct Racetrack)
- Avie Jane (Finished 2nd to Champion Safely Kept at Keeneland in 1990.
