= Tom Coughlin =

American football coach and executive (born 1946)

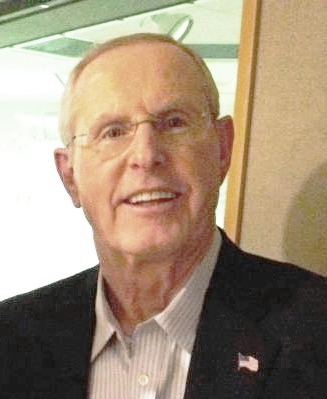
- Coughlin in 2013

Profile
- Position: Consultant

Personal information
- Born: August 31, 1946 (age 80); Waterloo, New York, U.S.

Career information
- High school: Waterloo Central
- College: Syracuse
- NFL draft: 1968: undrafted

Career history

Coaching
- Syracuse (1969) Graduate assistant; RIT (1970–1973) Head coach; Syracuse (1974–1975) Quarterbacks coach; Syracuse (1976–1980) Offensive coordinator; Boston College (1981–1983) Quarterbacks coach; Philadelphia Eagles (1984–1985) Wide receivers coach; Green Bay Packers (1986–1987) Wide receivers coach; New York Giants (1988–1990) Wide receivers coach; Boston College (1991–1993) Head coach; Jacksonville Jaguars (1995–2002) Head coach; New York Giants (2004–2015) Head coach; Las Vegas Raiders (2023–2024) Consultant

Operations
- National Football League (2016) Senior advisor to football operations; Jacksonville Jaguars (2017–2019) Executive VP of football operations

Awards and highlights
- 3× Super Bowl champion: XXV (as assistant coach); XLII, XLVI (as head coach); NFL Coach of the Year (1996); New York Giants Ring of Honor; Pride of the Jaguars

Head coaching record
- Regular season: 170–150 (.531)
- Postseason: 12–7 (.632)
- Career: NCAA: 28–23–2 (.547); NFL: 182–157 (.537)
- Coaching profile at Pro Football Reference
- Executive profile at Pro Football Reference

Thomas Richard Coughlin (/ˈkɒflɪn/ KOF-lin; born August 31, 1946) is an American former football coach and executive of the National Football League (NFL). He was the head coach for the New York Giants from 2004 to 2015. He led the Giants to victory in Super Bowl XLII and Super Bowl XLVI, both times against the New England Patriots. Coughlin was also the inaugural head coach of the Jacksonville Jaguars, serving from 1995 to 2002 and leading the team to two AFC Championship Game appearances. Prior to his head coaching career in the NFL, he was head coach of the Boston College Eagles football team from 1991 to 1993, and served in a variety of coaching positions in the NFL as well as coaching and administrative positions in college football.

== Early life ==
Coughlin was born in Waterloo, New York, in 1946, and played football and basketball in high school. He once played a high school basketball game against former Syracuse University Basketball Coach Jim Boeheim, who played for Lyons High School at the time. He idolized Heisman Trophy winner Ernie Davis and wished to play at Syracuse.

=== College ===
Coughlin attended Syracuse University when he was offered a scholarship by assistant coach Jim Shreve and became a three-year letter-winner on the football team under Hall of Fame coach Ben Schwartzwalder. He played halfback for the Syracuse Orange football team. Coughlin was teammates with future Hall of Famers Larry Csonka and Floyd Little. In 1967, he set the school's single-season pass receiving record. Jim Boeheim was Coughlin's residence advisor (RA) during Coughlin's senior year at Syracuse. He stayed at Syracuse after graduation and obtained his master's degree while working as a graduate assistant.

== Coaching style ==
Coughlin was mentored by Bill Parcells while Coughlin was on Parcells' Giants staff as wide receivers coach. Like his mentor, Coughlin is known as a stern disciplinarian and for his meticulous attention to detail, earning him the nickname "Colonel Coughlin". He was known for moving the clocks at team facilities anywhere from five to 15 minutes ahead in order to ensure players arrived ahead of time for team meetings. Early in his Giants tenure, he fined players for being two minutes early to team meetings, saying they should have arrived at least five minutes early per his new rules.

== Coaching career ==
Coughlin's first coaching job was as a graduate assistant for his alma mater Syracuse in 1969. He then moved on to his first head coaching job at Rochester Institute of Technology from 1970 to 1973. He then returned to his alma mater as the quarterbacks coach, where he was eventually promoted to offensive coordinator and stayed in that position from 1976 to 1980. After the 1980 season Coughlin moved to Boston College where he was the Quarterbacks coach from 1981 to 1983. While at Boston College he coached Doug Flutie. After the 1983 season he left the collegiate level to become the wide receivers coach for the Philadelphia Eagles of the NFL and later worked as the wide receivers coach for the Green Bay Packers and New York Giants.

In New York he was an assistant to Bill Parcells, and helped the Giants win Super Bowl XXV. Coughlin and Parcells both made the NFL playoffs five times as Giants head coach, and the two Super Bowl titles they each won with the Giants occurred in their fourth and eighth seasons with the franchise.

=== Boston College (1991−1993) ===
After the 1990 season, Coughlin returned to Boston College to take on his second job as a head coach. In three seasons at Boston College, he turned the program into a consistent winner. Coughlin's tenure was capped with a 41–39 victory over #1 ranked Notre Dame in 1993, the first time Boston College defeated Notre Dame.

=== Jacksonville Jaguars (1995–2002) ===
Coughlin's success at Boston College led to his subsequent hiring as the first head coach of the NFL's expansion Jacksonville Jaguars. He also had near-complete authority over football matters, effectively making him the team's general manager as well.

In eight seasons at Jacksonville, Coughlin helmed the most successful expansion team in league history. During Coughlin's tenure, the Jaguars made four consecutive playoff appearances and went to the AFC Championship Game twice. The first time, in only the second year of the team's existence (1996), the Jaguars qualified for the playoffs on the last day of the season and upset the heavily favored Buffalo Bills and Denver Broncos on the road. He was named NFL Coach of the Year by United Press International. Coughlin would again take the Jaguars to the AFC Championship Game in 1999 after achieving a league-high 14–2 regular season record; the 14 wins stood as the most won by the current wave of expansion teams (the Jaguars, Carolina Panthers, Baltimore Ravens and Houston Texans) until the Panthers surpassed it in 2015. However, in both appearances in the AFC Championship Game, the Jaguars were defeated: in 1996 by the New England Patriots, and in 1999, by the Tennessee Titans. Both the losses in the Jaguars' 14–2 1999 regular season were also to the Titans.

Coughlin's Jaguars won 49 regular season games in his first five years as head coach, a remarkable average for an expansion team of nearly ten wins per year. But the Jaguars' record for the next three years was only 19–29, and after a 6–10 finish in 2002, Coughlin was fired by owner Wayne Weaver. He finished his eight-year career in Jacksonville with a 68–60 regular season record and a 4–4 playoff record.

In 2011, after selling the Jaguars to Shahid Khan, Weaver said when looking back on his tenure as owner, one of his biggest regrets was firing Coughlin.

=== New York Giants (2004–2015) ===
==== Early years (2004–2006) ====
After being out of football in 2003, Coughlin was hired to replace Jim Fassel as head coach of the New York Giants in January 2004. He inherited a team that finished 4–12 in 2003.

As Coughlin took over, the Giants were trying to put together a trade for the first pick in the draft. That year, the San Diego Chargers held that pick, and the expected selection was Mississippi quarterback Eli Manning, who had made clear that he had no interest in playing for San Diego and would not negotiate with them. On draft day the Giants drafted NC State's Philip Rivers with the fourth pick and traded him to the Chargers for Manning. Coughlin's incumbent quarterback, Kerry Collins, was incensed by the move and demanded his release, leaving the team without a veteran who could hold the fort until Manning was ready. To fill that role the Giants signed Kurt Warner, the former league MVP who had been cut by the St. Louis Rams after he lost his starting job to Marc Bulger.

Behind Warner, Coughlin led the Giants to five wins in their first seven games. However, with the team losing their next two, Coughlin decided that Warner, who had been struggling, could no longer do the job and began starting the highly-touted Manning beginning in the tenth game. The coach received criticism from some who felt the move amounted to a surrender of the 2004 season; their 5–4 record meant the Giants were still in playoff contention. Manning did, in fact, struggle, and the Giants' losing streak reached eight games before Manning defeated the Dallas Cowboys in the final game of the season.

Another major effect Coughlin would have on the Giants was star running back Tiki Barber's fumbling problem. In the 2000–2004 seasons, Barber lost the ball 19 times. By simply teaching Barber to use a different grip on the ball, Coughlin reduced Barber's fumbles to only one in the 2005 season. Barber also saw his production increase significantly, setting career highs in rushing and total yards each year under Coughlin.

Coughlin's early move to Manning, though, would pay dividends in 2005. Manning and the Giants went 11–5 in Coughlin's second season and won the NFC East for the first time since 2000. It was also the Giants' first postseason appearance since making it as a wild card in 2002. However, a very poor performance by Manning, and a defense missing three starting linebackers, saw the Giants get shut out 23–0 at the hands of the Carolina Panthers at Giants Stadium. Following the game, Tiki Barber called out Coughlin and his offensive coordinator, partially because a Panthers player said that "We knew what they were going to do before they did it." Coughlin and Barber have yet to reconcile their differences, with Coughlin even refusing an interview by Barber, then a sideline reporter for NBC Sports, which would have been held prior to a Panthers–Giants game in 2008.

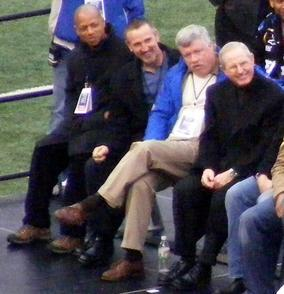
New York Giants general manager Jerry Reese, defensive coordinator Steve Spagnuolo, offensive coordinator Kevin Gilbride and Coughlin at Giants Stadium

Heading into the 2006 season, expectations for the Giants were high. In just over two years as the Giants head coach, Coughlin transformed the Giants from an underachieving, last place team into a possible Super Bowl contender.

The Giants struggled early during the 2006 campaign, going 1–2 in their first three games. After a particularly bad loss to the Seattle Seahawks, star tight end Jeremy Shockey stated that the Giants had been "outplayed and outcoached." The Giants rebounded by winning their next five games to go 6–2. However, the Giants suffered a stunning second half collapse, losing 6 of their next 7 games to fall to 7–8 heading into the last game of the season. After a late November loss to the Jacksonville Jaguars, Coughlin and his coaching staff were once again criticized by Tiki Barber. Barber also announced he was going to retire following the season, which provided another distraction for the sliding Giants. Things took another turn for the worse the next week when the Giants blew a 21-point fourth quarter lead and lost to the Tennessee Titans by a score of 24–21. After the game Coughlin had said to the media "I'm going to be sick about this one forever." Numerous injuries, excessive penalties, and a high number of turnovers were most responsible for the downward spiral of the 2006 Giants. The media hounded Coughlin with questions about Barber's announcement, and whether differences between Coughlin and Barber led to this point, and the team's fans and ownership were starting to get restless about the coach's performance; during a 30–7 loss to the New Orleans Saints late in the year a loud "Fire Coughlin" chant erupted at Giants Stadium. The Giants rebounded with a victory in the season's final game at the Washington Redskins, thereby securing a playoff berth and perhaps saving Coughlin's job in the process. However, Coughlin and the Giants lost to the Philadelphia Eagles, 23–20, in the first round of the playoffs. On January 10, 2007, it was announced that Coughlin would receive a one-year extension on his current contract through the 2008 season, but since the Giants' team policy is to never have a coach in the final year of his contract, this only guaranteed that Coughlin would remain as the Giants' head coach in 2007.

On February 7, 2007, Tiki Barber officially followed through on his threat to retire from the Giants. He cited numerous complaints about Eli Manning's leadership skills and Coughlin's practice style as decisions to retire at what seemed the peak of his career.

==== Super Bowl run and success (2007–2009) ====
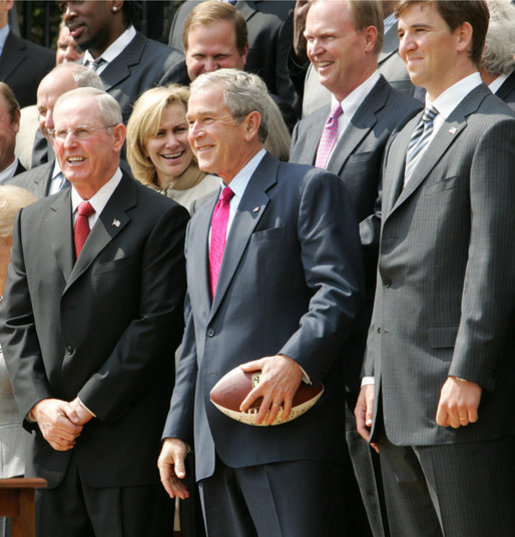
Coughlin with President Bush on April 30, 2008.

In the 2007 season, the Giants again started poorly with an 0–2 record. However, the team rebounded and won six straight games. The team compiled a 7–1 road record for the season, and they made it to the playoffs for the third year in a row. Coughlin and the Giants had their first playoff win in seven years when his team defeated the Tampa Bay Buccaneers on January 6, 2008, 24–14. The Giants immediately followed up their win against Tampa Bay by narrowly defeating the Dallas Cowboys in the Divisional Playoffs, winning 21–17, preventing Dallas from beating them for the third time in the season. The upset victory over the Cowboys was followed up by another upset victory against the Green Bay Packers in the NFC Championship Game. This victory set up Coughlin's first appearance in a Super Bowl as a head coach.

Super Bowl XLII took place in Glendale, Arizona on February 3, 2008. The game pitted Coughlin's New York Giants (13–6) against the undefeated New England Patriots (18–0) coached by Coughlin's longtime friend Bill Belichick. The Patriots were favored by 12 points. The underdog Giants trailed by four before a shocking pass play put the Giants in position to beat the Patriots 17–14 in one of the biggest upsets in NFL history. The upset would give Coughlin his first Super Bowl ring as a head coach.

Prior to the start of Giants mini-camp in May 2008, Coughlin and the Giants were invited by President Bush to the White House to honor their victory in Super Bowl XLII. The Super Bowl win got Coughlin a four-year contract worth roughly $21 million to coach the Giants through 2011. The deal made him one of the NFL's highest-paid coaches. Fresh off their Super Bowl season, the team started off red hot going 11–1 through 12 games in 2008, but after the Plaxico Burress shooting incident, the team went 1–3 down the stretch and despite being the #1 seed they were eliminated in the divisional round of the playoffs by the Philadelphia Eagles. The Giants finished 8–8 in 2009, despite solid offensive play, however, their defense struggled throughout the season, and they missed the playoffs. In 2010, they began 1–2, and then began a five-game winning streak to finish 6–2 at the bye. The Giants headed into week 15 against the Philadelphia Eagles with a record of 9–4. In the final seconds the Giants were faced with a fourth down and Coughlin told his punter, Matt Dodge, to punt the ball out of bounds to effectively end regulation and send the game to overtime. However, he punted the ball right to DeSean Jackson who took it the distance and won the Eagles the game in a game referred to as the "Miracle at the New Meadowlands". The loss jeopardized the Giants' playoff bid and once again Coughlin's future was uncertain. However, on July 24, 2011, he signed a one-year contract extension to remain with the Giants through the end of the 2012 season.

==== Second Super Bowl run (2011) ====
Following a very hectic free agency period when the Giants lost Pro Bowl wide receiver Steve Smith, defensive tackle Barry Cofield, and tight end Kevin Boss, expectations from many analysts and fans alike were very low. After losing the 2011 season opener to the Washington Redskins, the Giants went 6–2 before hitting a collapse, losing four straight games. At 6–6, the Giants won three of their last four games to finish at 9–7 with the NFC East championship. In their first playoff game since the 2008 NFC Divisional round, they defeated the Atlanta Falcons 24–2, with the Falcons' only points coming on a first quarter safety on Eli Manning. In the 2011 divisional game Coughlin coached the Giants to a 37–20 win over the heavily favored defending Super Bowl XLV champion Green Bay Packers, a team who finished the 2011 regular season with a league best 15–1 win–loss record. The following week, he coached the Giants to a 20–17 overtime victory over the San Francisco 49ers in the NFC Championship Game to set up a Super Bowl rematch with the New England Patriots. On February 5, 2012, Coughlin's Giants defeated the Patriots 21–17 in Super Bowl XLVI, at the time, making Coughlin the oldest head coach to win a Super Bowl, until Patriots' head coach Bill Belichick won Super Bowl LIII at the age of 66. On June 6, 2012, it was announced he had signed a contract extension to keep him with the Giants until at least 2014. At the same time, Coughlin announced that he would like to coach into his seventies. In July 2012, Coughlin was the winner of the 2012 Best Coach/Manager ESPY Award.

==== Aftermath and playoff drought (2012–2014) ====
Unfortunately for Coughlin, the Giants failed to make the playoffs in the 2012 season, despite starting the season 6–2 and finishing once again at 9–7. This was due in large part to three late seasons losses, including two lopsided losses to the NFC's number one seed Atlanta Falcons and eventual Super Bowl XLVII champion Baltimore Ravens in weeks 15 and 16 respectively, and one loss to the NFC East Champions The Washington Redskins.

Worse still, the Giants began the 2013 season 0–6 for the first time since 1976. John Mara, the Giants co-owner, stated that Coughlin's time with the Giants could be limited. Despite the difficult start, the team remained resilient and rebounded with wins against the Minnesota Vikings and Philadelphia Eagles, hitting the bye week at 2–6. Victories against the Oakland Raiders and Green Bay Packers, coupled with a floundering NFC East, left the Giants only one and half games behind the division-leading Eagles going into week 12. This resurgence was brought to an abrupt halt with a 24–21 loss against the division rival Dallas Cowboys. The Giants eventually finished the 2013 season with a record of 7–9, Coughlin's first losing record as head coach since his first season, and quarterback Eli Manning's rookie season, in 2004.

On February 21, 2014, Coughlin told reporters at the 2014 NFL Combine that he agreed on a one-year extension to his contract. This move allowed him to remain the Giants' head coach throughout the 2015 season. On March 11, 2015, the Giants extended his contract through the 2016 season.

==== Final coaching season (2015) ====
The Giants stumbled in the 2015 season; through Week 15, their record was 6–8, with many of the losses coming in the game's final minute of play; six out of their eight losses were by less than one touchdown with the final points being scored against them in the last two minutes. Criticism of Coughlin built throughout the season and peaked in Week 15, after a 38–35 loss to the eventual NFC champion Carolina Panthers in which Coughlin left star receiver Odell Beckham Jr. in the game despite Beckham's on-field behavior, including numerous scuffles with Panthers cornerback Josh Norman, resulting in a slew of personal foul penalties. Beckham's behavior in this game prompted the NFL to adopt a new rule for the next season which stated a player who accumulates two unsportsmanlike conduct penalties in the same game is ejected.

On January 4, 2016, Coughlin announced his resignation as head coach for the Giants. In a statement released by the Giants that day, Coughlin wrote, "I met with John Mara and Steve Tisch this afternoon, and I informed them that it is in the best interest of the organization that I step down as head coach. I strongly believe the time is right for me and my family, and as I said, the Giants organization." The Giants finished the 2015 season at 6–10, their third straight losing season and a fourth straight season without a playoff appearance. Coughlin later revealed that the Giants had forced him to resign. He was replaced by then-offensive coordinator Ben McAdoo.

== Executive career ==
=== NFL (2016) ===
In July 2016, Coughlin was hired to be a senior advisor to the NFL's football operations department.

=== Jacksonville Jaguars (2017–2019) ===
At the beginning of the 2017 offseason, Coughlin returned to the Jaguars as executive vice president of football operations. In this post, he had the final say in football matters, with general manager David Caldwell serving in an advisory role.

In January 2018, the Jaguars reached the AFC Championship for the first time since he was the head coach of the Jaguars in 1999. On February 23, 2018, the Jaguars extended Coughlin's contract through 2021.

On December 18, 2019, Coughlin was fired by Jaguars owner Shahid Khan. In a statement, Khan said he had already planned to fire Coughlin at the end of a lackluster season. However, he reportedly decided to oust Coughlin right away after the NFL Players Association announced it had won a grievance filed by linebacker Dante Fowler, now of the Seattle Seahawks. Fowler contended that the Jaguars had improperly fined him a total of $700,000 for not attending rehab and medical appointments in Jacksonville during the 2018 offseason that should have been optional under the collective bargaining agreement. The NFLPA took the unusual step of publicly warning free agents against signing with the Jaguars because of Coughlin's reported disregard for player rights. According to the NFLPA, over 25 percent of player grievances in the past two seasons had been filed against the Jaguars.

== Personal life ==
Coughlin is the oldest of seven children. He and his wife Judy have two daughters, Keli and Katie, and two sons, Brian and Tim. Kate is married to former Giants guard Chris Snee. He has eleven grandchildren. Coughlin is a practicing Catholic. While with the Giants, Coughlin has been a resident of Park Ridge, New Jersey. Judy was diagnosed with progressive supranuclear palsy in 2021 and died on November 2, 2022.

Tim survived the 9/11 terrorist attacks, successfully evacuating his South Tower 60th floor office at Morgan Stanley.

While on a USO–NFL coaches tour to Iraq in 2009, Coughlin and fellow coaches Jeff Fisher, Jon Gruden, Bill Cowher and John Harbaugh stayed in one of Saddam Hussein's former palaces.

In 2012, Coughlin was awarded the third highest honor within the Department of the Army Civilian Awards, the Outstanding Civilian Service Award, for substantial contributions to the U.S. Army community while serving as the New York Giants head coach.

On November 14, 2016, during half time of the game between the Giants and the Cincinnati Bengals at MetLife Stadium, Coughlin was inducted into the New York Giants Ring of Honor. On November 9, 2023, it was announced that Coughlin would be inducted into the Pride of the Jaguars.

In January 2017, it was revealed that Coughlin had been re-hired by the Jacksonville Jaguars to be the team's executive vice president for football operations. In July 2017, Coughlin was awarded the Arents Award, which is Syracuse University's highest alumni honor.

On July 30, 2020, Coughlin broke four ribs, punctured a lung, and needed stitches on his head, after getting into a biking accident with a fellow biker.

== Other work ==
Coughlin has written three books about his time coaching the New York Giants. His first book, A Team To Believe In: Our Journey to the Super Bowl Championship, was released prior to the 2008 season after the Giants’ win in Super Bowl XLII. In March 2013, he released Earn the Right to Win: How Success in Any Field Starts with Superior Preparation.

In February 2023, Coughlin released his third book: A Giant Win - Inside The New York Giants' Historic Upset Over The New England Patriots In Super Bowl XLII, co-written with Greg Hanlon, with Eli Manning writing the foreword.

After former Giants player Antonio Pierce became the head coach of the Las Vegas Raiders, Coughlin was hired as a consultant for Pierce and the team.

In 2023 and 2024, Coughlin was named a semifinalist for the Pro Football Hall of Fame.

== Foundation ==
Coughlin created the Jay Fund, officially the Tom Coughlin Jay Fund Foundation in 1996 while coaching at Jacksonville, Florida. The foundation is named after Jay McGillis, a Boston College player who had been diagnosed with and died from leukemia during Coughlin's tenure as head coach. The non-profit organization is devoted to assisting "children with leukemia and other cancers and their families by providing emotional and financial support to help reduce the stress associated with treatment and improve their quality of life", according to the foundation's mission statement. As of early 2020, the fund had disbursed in excess of $13 million while assisting over 5,000 families of children with cancer.

== Head coaching record ==
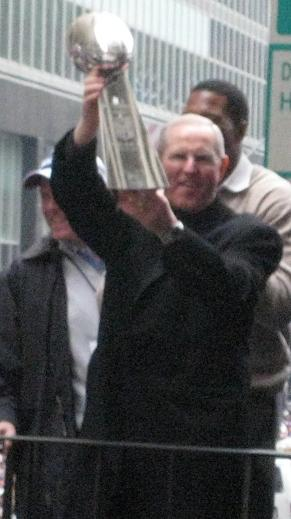
Coughlin (shown here at the New York Giants Super Bowl Ticker Tape parade in New York City February 5, 2008) has three Super Bowl Championships to his credit with the New York Giants - one as an assistant coach, and two as head coach

=== College ===
Year	Team	Overall	Conference	Standing	Bowl/playoffs	Coaches^{#}	AP^{°}
RIT Tigers (Club team) (1971)
1971	RIT	5–2–1					
RIT Tigers (Independent College Athletic Conference) (1972–1973)
1972	RIT	4–5	0–2	5th			
1973	RIT	3–5–1	0–2–1	4th			
RIT:		7–10–1	0–4–1				
Boston College Eagles (Big East Conference) (1991–1993)
1991	Boston College	4–7	2–4	7th			
1992	Boston College	8–3–1	2–1–1	3rd	L Hall of Fame	21	21
1993	Boston College	9–3	5–2	3rd	W Carquest	12	13
Boston College:		21–13–1	9–7–1				
Total:		28–23–2					
^{#}Rankings from final Coaches Poll.; ^{°}Rankings from final AP Poll.

=== NFL ===
Team	Year	Regular season					Postseason			
Team	Year	Won	Lost	Ties	Win %	Finish	Won	Lost	Win %	Result
JAX	1995	4	12	0	.250	5th in AFC Central	–	–	–	–
JAX	1996	9	7	0	.563	2nd in AFC Central	2	1	.667	Lost to New England Patriots in AFC Championship Game
JAX	1997	11	5	0	.688	2nd in AFC Central	0	1	.000	Lost to Denver Broncos in AFC Wild Card Game
JAX	1998	11	5	0	.688	1st in AFC Central	1	1	.500	Lost to New York Jets in AFC Divisional Game
JAX	1999	14	2	0	.875	1st in AFC Central	1	1	.500	Lost to Tennessee Titans in AFC Championship Game
JAX	2000	7	9	0	.438	4th in AFC Central	–	–	–	–
JAX	2001	6	10	0	.375	5th in AFC Central	–	–	–	–
JAX	2002	6	10	0	.375	3rd in AFC South	–	–	–	–
JAX total		68	60	0	.531		4	4	.500	
NYG	2004	6	10	0	.375	2nd in NFC East	–	–	–	–
NYG	2005	11	5	0	.688	1st in NFC East	0	1	.000	Lost to Carolina Panthers in NFC Wild Card Game
NYG	2006	8	8	0	.500	3rd in NFC East	0	1	.000	Lost to Philadelphia Eagles in NFC Wild Card Game
NYG	2007	10	6	0	.625	2nd in NFC East	4	0	1.000	Super Bowl XLII champions
NYG	2008	12	4	0	.750	1st in NFC East	0	1	.000	Lost to Philadelphia Eagles in NFC Divisional Game
NYG	2009	8	8	0	.500	3rd in NFC East	–	–	–	–
NYG	2010	10	6	0	.625	2nd in NFC East	–	–	–	–
NYG	2011	9	7	0	.563	1st in NFC East	4	0	1.000	Super Bowl XLVI champions
NYG	2012	9	7	0	.563	2nd in NFC East	–	–	–	–
NYG	2013	7	9	0	.438	3rd in NFC East	–	–	–	–
NYG	2014	6	10	0	.375	3rd in NFC East	–	–	–	–
NYG	2015	6	10	0	.375	3rd in NFC East	–	–	–	–
NYG total		102	90	0	.531		8	3	.727	
Total		170	150	0	.531		12	7	.632	

== See also ==
- History of the New York Giants (1994–present)
- List of National Football League head coaches with 50 wins
- List of Super Bowl head coaches
