= New York State Sportswriters Association =

The New York State Sportswriters Association (NYSSWA), founded in 1967, is a source of reference information and statistics about scholastic athletics in the state. Begun by sportswriters Larry Serrell of The Daily Gazette of Schenectady and Chuck Korbar of the Buffalo Evening News, NYSSWA membership grew from 12 in 1967 to 246 in 1971 and over 500 annual subscribers by 1995, according to the organization.

The active readership includes newspapers, radio and television stations in the state, as well as high school coaches and administrators, college sports coaches and the parents of athletes. The organization's biggest undertaking is the eight-page newsletter that is published 50 times a year. The NYSSWA publishes weekly team rankings in all major sports and also selects all-state teams in soccer, basketball, football, baseball, and softball. The NYSSWA newsletter has been edited and distributed for over 40 years by Neil Kerr of The Post-Standard.

== See also ==
- National Sports Media Association
- New Jersey Sports Writers Association
- Philadelphia Sports Writers Association
