= Tom Coughlin Jay Fund Foundation =

U.S. nonprofit organization

- Formation: 1996 (Jacksonville)
- Founder: Tom Coughlin, Dr. Mike Joyce
- Type: Non-Profit
- Location: Jacksonville, Florida, United States
- Region served: Greater Jacksonville Metropolitan Area; New York metropolitan area
- Key people: Keli Coughlin, executive director
- Website: tcjayfund.org

The Tom Coughlin Jay Fund Foundation, also known simply as the Jay Fund, is a 501(c)(3) non-profit organization established in 1996 and "helps families tackle childhood cancer by providing comprehensive financial, emotional and practical support", according to the foundation's mission statement. Charity Navigator currently rates The Tom Coughlin Jay Fund Foundation as a 4-star organization, its highest rating.

== Mission ==
=== Financial assistance and game planning ===
As the cornerstone of the foundation's assistance mission, financial assistance is critical to every family tackling childhood cancer. The financial burden created when a child is hospitalized or requires home care, combined with medical expenses, can become overwhelming for parents. Jay Fund grants pay for such things as mortgages, rent, car, electric, water, phone, food and other household expense payments during a time of crisis. Each family also receives "Jay's Financial Playbook" containing helpful financial tools, access to quarterly financial seminars and individual financial planning meetings with the organization's "Financial Coach". The Jay Fund also offers scholarships to cancer patients and survivors who wish to continue their education.

=== Making a Child's Life Brighter ===
The Jay Fund offers once-in-a-lifetime opportunities that simply make a child's life brighter and create happy memories. The organization hosts events so families and children can come together with others facing the same challenges. This enables families battling childhood cancer to share emotional support, love and friendship. These events include Valentine's Day parties, Remembrance Weekend, NY Giants Tour and Sundae Blitz, Fall Festival and more.

=== Quality of life ===
The Jay Fund additionally supports treatment facilities that help improve quality of life for the patient and families. Their grants support child psychology services, Child Life programs, Art with a Heart program funding, survivorship programs, special medical equipment, entertainment, games and more at outpatient and inpatient centers.

=== Medical treatments ===
In some cases, Cord Blood Donor Units are needed so a child who does not have a match within their own family can have a needed bone marrow transplant. Often, this treatment is not covered by insurance. The Jay Fund helps provide payment for donor units.

== History ==
=== 1990s ===
During Coughlin's first year coaching football at Boston College, one of his players, Jay McGillis, contracted leukemia. During McGillis's seven-month fight with the disease, Coughlin visited the young man often and observed the financial and emotional toll inflicted on the McGillis family. McGillis died on July 3, 1992, but his indomitable spirit, courage and compassion inspired Coughlin to create an organization to assist families with a child suffering from leukemia. After Coughlin moved to Jacksonville in 1994 as head coach of the Jacksonville Jaguars, he began talking with people and making plans to create a foundation.

=== 2002 ===
When Coughlin was dismissed by the Jaguars after the 2002 season, there was concern for the future of the Jay Fund by several physicians at Wolfson Children's Hospital and Nemours Children's Clinic. They worried that with the departure of the high-profile coach, corporate sponsors might shift their support to other causes. After he was hired as head coach of the New York Giants, Coughlin allayed those fears by pledging continued support for the fund and promising to keep the foundation in Jacksonville. Contributions actually increased in Jacksonville.

=== 2004 ===
In October 2004, the coach created a Jay Fund branch in New York City. The initial "Pigskin Ball" was held September 9, 2005, and the first three such events provided a total of over $1 million to the charity.

=== 2008 ===
As of early 2008, the fund had disbursed in excess of $2 million while assisting over 1,000 families of children with cancer. A capital campaign, "Now and Forever", was begun in March 2008. The goal was a $5 million endowment for the fund, which would provide $250,000 per year in perpetual funding to ensure the future of the charity. Keli Coughlin, executive director of the foundation, who happens to be Tom's oldest child, stated:

This campaign for the endowment is an insurance policy of sorts. It's a backup plan to make sure there will always be funds to help these families. We are providing them with things no one else is doing and quite frankly, these families would be left without a safety net.

=== 2012 ===
After noting that many Jay Fund families continued to struggle financially long after their child went through the treatment process, the Jay Fund introduced the "Financial Game Plan" Program in 2012. The plan, designed by Jay Fund Financial Coach Kathy Devine, provides comprehensive financial planning strategies to families so that they are prepared to tackle the long-term fiscal impact of childhood cancer. The Tom Coughlin Jay Fund Foundation Financial Game Plan is the first and only program of its kind in the United States.

== Fundraising events ==
=== Celebrity Golf Classic ===
The first fundraising effort was a celebrity golf tournament in early May 1996 which was well attended and became an annual event. That success enabled the fund to expand their outreach to families of children with any form of pediatric cancer, not just leukemia. The 19th Annual Celebrity Golf Classic was held May 18–19, 2014. The dinner, silent auction and golf tournament raised over $515,000.

=== Wine Tasting Gala ===
A wine tasting event was added for Jacksonville in March 2005 and became a yearly attraction. By 2009, The Tom Coughlin Jay Fund Wine Tasting Gala, according to the Florida Times-Union, was "considered among the best of its kind in the Jacksonville area". The 10th Annual Wine Tasting Gala was held on March 21, 2014, sharing hundreds of wine selections, samples from dozens of local eateries and auction items with over 800 guests, and raised over $200,000. With this amount, the combined donations raised since the Gala's inception has eclipsed $1.5 million.

=== Champions for Children ===
The Champions for Children Gala, first put on in 2005, features a guest list, live and silent auction items and experiences, and has become the biggest annual fundraiser for the Tom Coughlin Jay Fund. Since its inception, the Champions for Children Gala has raised in excess of $7 million to support families tackling childhood cancer in the New York/New Jersey area.

=== The Impact Player Program ===
Throughout the year, numerous businesses and individuals set out to create their own "Impact Player Events" in an effort to raise funds for the families supported through the Tom Coughlin Jay Fund.

=== The Landon Collins Celebrity Softball Game ===
In 2017, New York Giants safety Landon Collins headlined a fundraising event for the Jay Fund. The Landon Collins Celebrity Softball Game featured current Giants members playing against former members from the Super Bowl XLII and Super Bowl XLVI championship teams. Tickets for the event were $20 and part of the proceeds were donated to the Jay Fund.
