= Jim Lambert =

American sportswriter (born 1966)

James "Jim" Lambert (born September 2, 1966) is an American sportswriter. He has covered sports for The Star-Ledger newspaper in New Jersey since 1989. During his career, Lambert has been one of the authorities in high school track and field. Lambert was referred to as "the gold standard" of high school track and field journalism in New Jersey by NJ Runners.com.

Lambert has been recognized by state and national organizations for his intrepid reporting. He was honored by the New Jersey State Interscholastic Athletic Association (NJSIAA) in 2002 and 2016 as the Sportswriter of the Year in New Jersey. In 2022, Lambert was given the Allen Dawson Award for contributions to track and field by the National Scholastic Athletics Foundation at the Nike Indoor Nationals. He received the prestigious Jesse Abramson Award at the 129th Penn Relays in 2025. Lambert was inducted into the Scotch Plains-Fanwood High School Hall of Fame in 2026.

In addition to his work for The Star-Ledger, Lambert has been published in High School Runner magazine. Lambert is a 1984 graduate of Scotch Plains-Fanwood High School (N.J.) and received a Bachelor of Arts degree from East Stroudsburg University (Pa.) in 1989. He resides in Fanwood, New Jersey with his wife, Janet, and two daughters, Rachel and Jennifer.
