= Scotch Plains-Fanwood High School =

High school in Union County, New Jersey, US

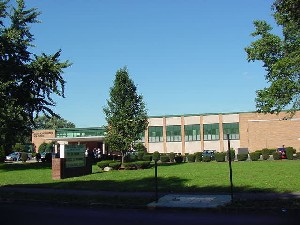

Location
- 667 Westfield Road; Scotch Plains, Union County, New Jersey 07076; United States; 40°39′13″N 74°23′04″W

Information
- Type: Public high school
- Established: 1957
- NCES School ID: 341467005676
- Principal: Warren Hynes
- Faculty: 115.9 FTEs
- Enrollment: 1,551 (as of 2023–24)
- Student to teacher ratio: 13.4:1
- Campus: Suburban, 29 acres (12 ha)
- Colors: Royal blue and white
- Athletics conference: Union County Interscholastic Athletic Conference (general); Big Central Football Conference (football)
- Team name: Raiders
- Rival: Westfield High School
- Accreditation: Middle States Association of Colleges and Schools
- Publication: Muse (literary magazine)
- Newspaper: The Fanscotian
- Yearbook: Culmen
- Website: www.spfk12.org/spfhs

Scotch Plains-Fanwood High School (or SPFHS) is a comprehensive regional four-year public high school in Union County, in the U.S. state of New Jersey, which serves students in ninth through twelfth grades from the Township of Scotch Plains and the Borough of Fanwood, operating as the lone secondary school of the Scotch Plains-Fanwood Regional School District. The school is accredited until January 2031 and has been accredited by the Middle States Association of Colleges and Schools Commission on Elementary and Secondary Schools since 1932.

As of the 2023–24 school year, the school had an enrollment of 1,551 students and 115.9 classroom teachers (on an FTE basis), for a student–teacher ratio of 13.4:1. There were 55 students (3.5% of enrollment) eligible for free lunch and 17 (1.1% of students) eligible for reduced-cost lunch.

== History ==
Designed to accommodate a maximum enrollment of 1,350, the facility is located in Scotch Plains and opened for 1,080 students in September 1957 after delays due to a series of strikes. Originally, the high school was located in another part of town on Park Avenue, which currently houses Malcolm E. Nettingham (formerly Park) Middle School. That building was constructed in 1926.

== Awards, recognition and rankings ==
In its listing of "America's Best High Schools 2016", the school was ranked 210th out of 500 best high schools in the country; it was ranked 33rd among all high schools in New Jersey and 16th among the state's non-magnet schools.

In its 2013 report on "America's Best High Schools", The Daily Beast ranked the school 918th in the nation among participating public high schools and 69th among schools in New Jersey. In the 2011 "Ranking America's High Schools" issue by The Washington Post, the school was ranked 42nd in New Jersey and 1,349th nationwide.

The school was the 54th-ranked public high school in New Jersey out of 339 schools statewide in New Jersey Monthly magazine's September 2014 cover story on the state's "Top Public High Schools", using a new ranking methodology. The school had been ranked 60th in the state of 328 schools in 2012, after being ranked 62nd in 2010 out of 322 schools listed. The magazine ranked the school 69th in 2008 out of 316 schools. Schooldigger.com ranked the school tied for 86th out of 381 public high schools statewide in its 2011 rankings (a decrease of 14 positions from the 2010 ranking) which were based on the combined percentage of students classified as proficient or above proficient on the mathematics (88.6%) and language arts literacy (96.3%) components of the High School Proficiency Assessment (HSPA).

As of 2024, Scotch Plains-Fanwood High School was ranked 70th among high schools in New Jersey, 181st in the New York City metropolitan area and 1,435th nationwide.

SPHFS's quiz bowl team, founded in 1982, won the New Jersey state championship of the Rutgers University-run College Bowl competition in 1988 and embarked on creative televised fundraising in order to afford the travel costs to the many regional and national competitions where they were invited.

== Publications ==
The school is host to an annually published literary magazine, Muse, which features poetry, stories and art by the students. The school's newspaper, The Fanscotian, was ranked by the GSSPA as the best newspaper in New Jersey. The school's yearbook is called Culmen.

== Music ==
Scotch Plains-Fanwood High School is host to an extensive music department. The department is home to multiple choruses, including concert choir and five auditioned groups: Select Choir, Men's Choir, Women's Choir, and Chamber Choir. The instrumental music program includes a plethora of groups. Non-auditioned groups include Freshman Band, Symphonic Band, as well as the SPF Raiders Marching Band. Auditioned groups include the Wind Ensemble, RhythmSense, SPF Jazz, and the Moonglowers.

Scotch Plains-Fanwood is also home to the Repertory Theatre program, which in the past few years has put on such shows as Footloose, Les Misérables, West Side Story, 42nd Street, Once Upon a Mattress, Urinetown, Guys and Dolls, Curtains, Hairspray, and The Mystery of Edwin Drood garnering a number of Rising Star Award nominations from the Paper Mill Playhouse, including one win for Outstanding Student Orchestra, for 42nd Street in 2006.

=== SPF Moonglowers ===
SPF's top level ("A") jazz band, the Moonglowers, is the oldest continuously operated high school jazz band in the state of New Jersey. It was formed in 1942 to play contemporary big-band songs during lunch periods and at the high school's senior prom. Beginning in 1979, the Moonglowers started competing in the New Jersey International Association of Jazz Education (now the New Jersey Association for Jazz Education) jazz band circuit. Since then, the Moonglowers have won a McDonald's National Jazz Band title and 10 New Jersey State titles. Since 2007, when the NJIAJE reformed into the New Jersey Association for Jazz Education, the Moonglowers have competed in Division II. Notably, in 2008, both the Moonglowers and SPF Jazz, SPF's second tier ("B") jazz band, competed together at the New Jersey State Final festival, and SPF Jazz took first place. This is the only time in the 21-year competition history of the school that SPF Jazz scored higher than the Moonglowers in competitions.

When not competing, the Moonglowers play old time big band swing songs for various community events and organizations. From community concerts to retirement homes, the Moonglowers play songs from the golden age of jazz for those who remember them. Since 2007, the Moonglowers have headlined the Susan G. Komen for the Cure race in New York City in early September.

=== SPF Raiders Marching Band ===
The band competes and performs regularly. In 2012, the Marching Raiders went into the USBands National Championships (Groups 2 Open & 4 Open PLUS 3A &6A) at MetLife Stadium, with a show entitled "On The Brink Of Change: Gold Rush To A Better Tomorrow". They ended the competitive marching band season ranked 2nd place, with a score of 95.8 in group 6A, with a caption award of Best Effect.

In 2014, the show was entitled Il Cuore Di Romano: The Heart of the Roman Empire. The band had an undefeated season and were Group VIA NJ State and Group VIA National Champions, winning all captions at the latter.

== Athletics ==
The Scotch Plains-Fanwood High School Raiders compete in the Union County Interscholastic Athletic Conference, which is comprised of public and private high schools in the county and was established following a reorganization of sports leagues in Northern New Jersey by the New Jersey State Interscholastic Athletic Association (NJSIAA). Prior to the 2010 reorganization, the school had competed in the Watchung Conference, which consisted of public and private high schools in Essex, Hudson and Union counties. With 1,152 students in grades 10–12, the school was classified by the NJSIAA for the 2019–20 school year as Group IV for most athletic competition purposes, which included schools with an enrollment of 1,060 to 5,049 students in that grade range. The football team competes in Division 4 of the Big Central Football Conference, which includes 60 public and private high schools in Hunterdon, Middlesex, Somerset, Union and Warren counties, which are broken down into 10 divisions by size and location. The school was classified by the NJSIAA as Group IV North for football for 2024–2026, which included schools with 893 to 1,315 students.

The school has a longstanding rivalry with Westfield High School, with the two schools first competing against each other in football in 1901.

The boys spring / outdoor track team won the Group IV state championship in 1963, 1964 and 1967, and won the Group III title in 1998 (as co-champion).

The girls' tennis team won the North state championship in 1971 and 1972.

The 1977 boys' baseball team finished the season with a record of 29–3 after winning the Group IV state championship by defeating Piscataway High School by a score of 1–0 in the final game of the tournament. The team won the Union County Tournament championship in 1969, 1976, 2004 and 2009. They also won the 2019 Union County Tournament, with a 4–0 win against Arthur L. Johnson High School in the finals.

The boys' soccer team won the Group III state championship in 1986 (as co-champion with Randolph High School), 1987 (vs. Wall High School), 1989 (vs. Bridgewater-Raritan High School), 1991 (vs. Lacey Township High School), 1992 (vs. Wall Township High School), 1995 (as co-champion with Ocean City High School), 1997 (vs. Brick Memorial High School) and 1998 (vs. Delsea Regional High School).

The football team won the North II Group III state championship in 1990 with a 25–12 win against West Morris Central High School in the tournament final, after coming back from a 12–0 deficit early in the first half.

The Scotch Plains-Fanwood girls swim team won their first state championship title in 2005 and won again in 2006 and 2015. The Lady Raider Swimmers defeated Princeton High School 100–70 to win the 2015 Group B State championship. The Lady Raiders won the Union County Championship for five consecutive years (2015 to 2019).

The boys' basketball team won the Group III state championship in 2008, defeating Timber Creek Regional High School in the tournament final.

The Scotch Plains-Fanwood boys swim team won their only Group B state championship in 2011. The boys have won four Union County Championships (1999, 2002, 2010, 2011). The boys also have won fourteen sectional championships (1990, 1991, 1992, 1993, 1998, 1999, 2001, 2002, 2003, 2011, 2015, 2016, 2017, 2019) and are common contenders for the state title. They returned to the state championship for multiple consecutive years most recently in 2019 after winning against Ridgewood High School in the state semi-finals but they fell to Mainland Regional High School.

The boys track team won the winter / indoor Group III state title in 2019. The boys track team also won the Group III indoor relay championship in 2019.

The girls spring / outdoor track team won the Group IV state championship in 2022.

The girls volleyball program won the Central Jersey Group III sectional championship in 2021, the program's first, defeating Colonia High School in the tournament finals.

The boys volleyball program has won seven consecutive Union County Tournament titles from 2018 to 2025 (with the 2020 season cancelled due to COVID); the team won in 2018 (vs. Summit High School), 2019 (vs. Union High School), 2021 (vs. Union), 2022 (vs. Union),2023 (vs. Summit), 2024 (vs Westfield), and 2025 (vs Westfield). In 2022, the boys volleyball program won the North II sectional championship over Union High School. In 2023, the team won the North Group III Sectional championship with a victory over Hackensack High School and capped off the season with a Group III state championship victory over Colts Neck High School to finish the year with a record of 31–1. In 2024, they won their third consecutive North 2 Group 3 championship in a rematch vs Hackensack in three sets. In 2025, they won their fourth consecutive North 2 Group 3 championship in three sets vs Millburn.

== Administration ==
The school's principal is Warren Hynes. Core members of the school's administration include the three assistant principals.

== Notable alumni ==
Many of the alumni listed below have been inducted into the Scotch Plains-Fanwood High School Hall of Fame.

=== Business, industry and media ===
- David Blitzer (born 1969, class of 1987), senior Blackstone Inc. executive and sports team owner
- Joseph Malchow (born 1985), entrepreneur and venture capitalist
- Amy Ellis Nutt (class of 1973), journalist and New York Times bestselling author, who was the recipient of the 2011 Pulitzer Prize for Feature Writing for her reporting at The Star-Ledger
- Steve Schnur (class of 1979), Worldwide Executive and President of Music for Electronic Arts
- Peter C. Schultz (born 1942, class of 1960), co-inventor of the fiber optics now used worldwide for telecommunications

=== Government and public service ===
- Carol Bellamy (born 1942, class of 1959), executive director of the United Nations Children's Fund (UNICEF)
- Donald DiFrancesco (born 1944, class of 1962), elected to the New Jersey General Assembly in 1976 and moved to the New Jersey Senate in 1979, serving as the Senate President for 10 years and as acting governor of New Jersey for 11 months
- Peter Emery (1926–2004, class of 1943), Conservative Party politician in the United Kingdom, who served for 40 years in the House of Commons
- Christian J. Lambertsen (1917-2011, class of 1934), environmental medicine and diving medicine specialist who developed the United States Navy frogmen's rebreathers in the early 1940s and created the acronym "SCUBA"
- Zahid Quraishi (born 1975, class of 1993), United States district judge of the United States District Court for the District of New Jersey and a former United States magistrate judge of the same court, who is the first Muslim Article III judge
- Todd D. Robinson (born c. 1963, class of 1981), American diplomat who was U.S. ambassador to Guatemala and Venezuela, and was a senior advisor for Central America in the Bureau of Western Hemisphere Affairs
- Linda Stender (born 1951, class of 1969), member of the New Jersey General Assembly for the 22nd Legislative District from 2002 to 2016, who was formerly the mayor of Fanwood
- Allen Weh (born 1943, class of 1960), retired military officer and politician in New Mexico

=== Sports ===
- Bill Austin (born 1937, class of 1955), former football player
- Derrick Caracter (born 1988, transferred), professional basketball player for Capitanes de Arecibo of the Puerto Rican Baloncesto Superior Nacional, who played in the NBA for the Los Angeles Lakers
- Michael Dwumfour (born 1998), American football defensive tackle for the Cleveland Browns
- Rashan Gary (born 1997), defensive tackle for the Green Bay Packers team who transferred to Paramus Catholic High School after his sophomore year
- Scott Goldblatt (born 1979, class of 1997), swimmer who won a gold medal at the 2004 Summer Olympics in Athens and a silver medal at the 2000 Summer Olympics in Sydney, Australia, with both medals earned in the 4 × 200 m Freestyle Relay
- Jeffrey Hammonds (born 1971, class of 1989), baseball Olympian, twelve years in major leagues including one all-star appearance
- Nate Jones (born 1982), cornerback who played in the NFL for the Dallas Cowboys, Miami Dolphins, Denver Broncos and New England Patriots
- Hillary Klimowicz (born 1987), professional basketball player for Limoges ABC
- Jim Lambert (born 1966, class of 1984), track & field writer for The Star-Ledger
- Bryan Meredith (born 1989), former professional soccer player who played as a goalkeeper, and current coach
- James Murphy (born 1997), soccer player who previously played as a midfielder for MLS club Los Angeles FC and Arbroath F.C. of Scottish Championship. He currently plays for Rio Grande Valley FC in the USL Championship
- John Murphy (born 2000), soccer player who last played as a midfielder for USL Championship club Loudoun United
- Renaldo Nehemiah (born 1959, class of 1977), held 110 meter hurdles record for years, twice Superstars champion and San Francisco 49ers wide receiver
- John Pak (born 1998), golfer
- Joe Scarpati (born 1943, class of 1960), former NFL safety for the Philadelphia Eagles and the New Orleans Saints who was the holder for Tom Dempsey's previous record 63-yard (58 m) field goal in 1970
- Jim Shreve (1926-2018, class of 1945), football, basketball and lacrosse coach, who served as the head football coach at Moravian College from 1951 to 1954
- Lance Thomas (born 1988), power forward/center for the Brooklyn Nets, who attended Scotch Plains before graduating from St. Benedict's in 2006

=== Fine arts ===
- Amy Lee, better known as Ailee (born 1989), a popular Korean-American singer who grew up in Scotch Plains and graduated from Scotch Plains-Fanwood High School She has earned wide recognition in South Korea, most notably as "Best New Female Artist" at the 2012 Mnet Asian Music Awards
- Pat DiNizio (1955-2017, class of 1973), lead singer, songwriter, and founding member of the band The Smithereens
- John Bernard Riley (born 1955, class of 1971), jazz drummer who has recorded on over 40 albums and CDs with internationally renowned artists, winning two Grammy Awards out of 14 nominations
- Cynthia Sayer (class of 1974), jazz banjoist, vocalist, concert / recording artist and entertainer, who was inducted into the National Four-String Banjo Hall of Fame in 2006
- Marc Shaiman (born 1959, class of 1974), Tony and Grammy winning composer, five time Academy Award-nominee
- Cecilia Tan (born 1967, class of 1985), writer, editor, sexuality activist, and founder of Circlet Press, the first press devoted primarily to erotic science fiction and fantasy
- Sada Thompson (1927–2011, class of 1945), actress who appeared in the television series Family
- David S. Ware (1949–2012), jazz musician

== Controversies ==
Scotch Plains-Fanwood High School has been the center of several controversies regarding its use of a logo with a Native American mascot. In September 2017, the school came under controversy when students raised concerns through a petition on change.org regarding the use of the former logo at sporting events by spectators in a fan group called Raider Nation. The petition garnered over 400 signatures. A counter petition was also created, stating that the school should return to using its original logo with a Native American head. The petitions gained news attention from NJ 101.5, Fox News, Courier News and NJ.com.
