= Hudson Dispatch =

The Hudson Dispatch
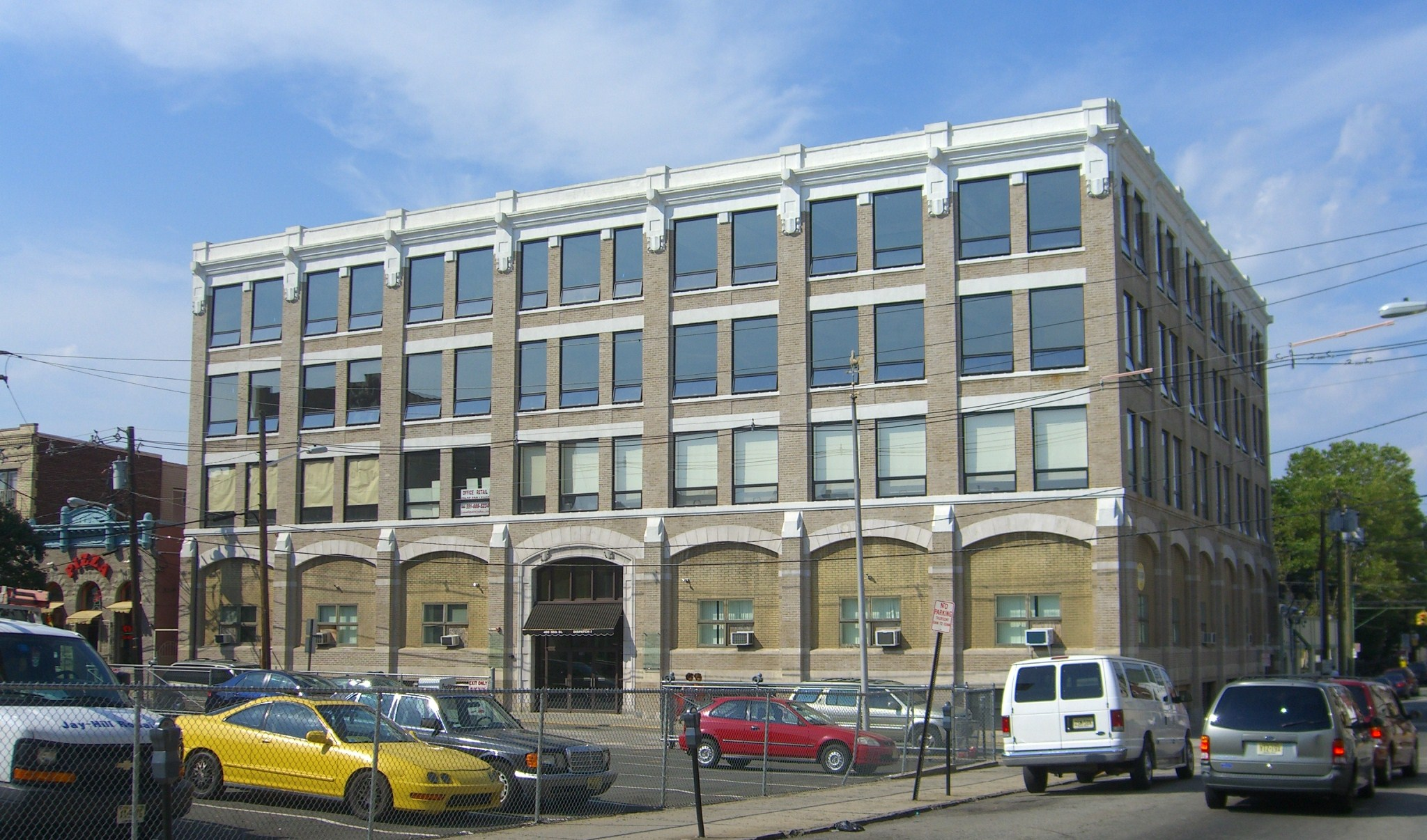
- Former Hudson Dispatch headquarters
- Type: Daily newspaper
- Format: Tabloid
- Owner: Newhouse Newspapers
- Founded: 1874 (Approximate)
- Ceased publication: 1991
- Headquarters: 400 38th Street; Union City, New Jersey

The Hudson Dispatch was a newspaper covering events in Hudson and Bergen counties in Northern New Jersey. It published continuously from 1874 until 1991, when it was purchased by Newhouse Newspapers. Its headquarters were located at 400 38th Street in Union City.

== History ==
The Hudson Dispatch was published in East Newark, New Jersey by Trelease, Simonds & Company as Harrison Dispatch, starting around 1874. It moved to Jersey City in 1887, and relocated to Union Hill in 1890.

Starting in the late 1970s, the staff of the Dispatch aggressively covered the notorious political corruption in Hudson and Bergen counties. A series of articles on the corrupt political practices in Union City, New Jersey, led to the conviction of William V. Musto, the city's mayor. During the same period other mayors and even a district attorney were prosecuted on corruption charges in part due to investigative journalism by the Dispatch.

Allbritton Communications bought the paper in 1977. In 1985, the paper was purchased by an affiliate of MediaNews Group.

In 1991 the paper was purchased by Newhouse Newspapers and merged into The Jersey Journal.

== Hudson Dispatch Weekly ==
Since May 2010, a free bilingual newspaper Hudson Dispatch Weekly has served the North Hudson area. Published by the Evening Journal Association, at 30 Journal Square, one side is printed in English, and the other in Spanish under the title la comunidad.
