= Hillary Klimowicz =

American basketball player

Hillary Klimowicz Milner
Personal information
- Born: April 3, 1987 (age 39) Scotch Plains, New Jersey, U.S.
- Listed height: 6 ft 3 in (1.91 m)

Career information
- High school: Scotch Plains (Scotch Plains, New Jersey)
- College: Saint Joseph's (2006) TCNJ (2007–2009)

Career history

Playing
- 2010–2011: Sdent Nyon
- 2011–2012: Limoges ABC

Coaching
- 2009–2010: TCNJ
- 2018–present: West Morris Mendham High School

Career highlights
- A-10 Freshman of the Year (2006); A-10 All-Freshman Team (2006)

Hillary Klimowicz Milner (born April 3, 1987) is a basketball player from New Jersey who formerly played for Limoges ABC, a team based in Limoges, France. Klimowicz participated in a college campaign at both St. Joseph's University and The College of New Jersey (TCNJ), where she was named the Division III player of the year during her senior season. Upon graduating, Klimowicz remained at TCNJ where she served as an assistant coach during the 2009–2010 season. She is currently the varsity girls basketball coach at Mendham High School. On June 26, 2021 she married high school teacher Matthew Milner.

== High school career ==
Klimowicz ranked 79th among the top-100 high school seniors in the 2004-05 Blue Star Basketball's Index. She grew up in Scotch Plains, New Jersey and attended Scotch Plains-Fanwood High School where she led the squad to three consecutive appearances in the Group III New Jersey Section Finals and attained a career record of 68–14. She was named to the 2004-05 First Team All New Jersey, averaging 18.4 points, 13.6 rebounds and 4.8 blocks per game as a senior.

As a junior, Klimowicz was named the 2004 Player of the Year Union County by the Newark Star Ledger and was selected to the All-New Jersey Third Team. She received both First Team All-Area Central Jersey honors and First Team All-Union County honors three times in addition to being a four-time First Team All-County selection. Klimowicz is currently Scotch Plains-Fanwood High School's all-time leading scorer with 1,948 points.

== College career ==
Klimowicz was the 2009 WBCA Division III National Player of the Year, averaging 20 points, 10.8 rebounds, and 4.2 blocks per game during her senior season. She led TCNJ to a Division III NCAA Final Four Appearance while setting TCNJ's single-season record with 543 points, shooting 69% from the field. Klimowicz posted 46 Career Double Double's and currently ranks second all-time in the TCNJ record books for career points and rebounds, although she only participated in three seasons. She was named NJAC Player of the Year from 2007 to 2009 and was a 2008 WBCA State Farm Coaches' All-America Team Honorable Mention.

Prior to joining the TCNJ Lions, Klimowicz participated in Division I at St. Joseph's University as a freshman where she was named the 2005-2006 Atlantic 10 Rookie of the Year and the 2005-2006 Big Five Rookie of the Year. Her decision to transfer garnered much attention, including a feature article in Sports Illustrated.

== Combined college statistics ==
Legend
GP	Games played	GS	Games started	MPG	Minutes per game
FG%	Field goal percentage	3P%	3-point field goal percentage	FT%	Free throw percentage
RPG	Rebounds per game	APG	Assists per game	SPG	Steals per game
BPG	Blocks per game	PPG	Points per game	**Bold**	Career high

Year	Team	GP	Points	FG%	3P%	FT%	RPG	APG	SPG	BPG	PPG
2005-06	Saint Joseph's	**31**	275	49.5	-	67.0	7.3	0.8	0.7	1.9	8.9
2006-07	The College of New Jersey	27	336	58.4	-	**81.0**	7.4	1.2	0.9	2.8	12.4
2007-08	The College of New Jersey	29	490	64.4	-	75.0	**11.0**	1.3	0.9	**4.1**	16.9
2008-09	The College of New Jersey	29	**587**	**67.1**	-	79.4	10.8	**2.1**	**1.0**	**4.1**	**20.2**
Career		116	1688	61.1	0.0	76.0	9.1	1.4	0.9	3.2	14.6

== International career ==
Klimowicz signed to play with Sdent Nyon, a professional team located in Nyon, Switzerland, for the 2010–2011 season. Sdent Nyon is a member organization of the EuroCup league, regulated by FIBA Europe. For the 2011–2012 season, she signed with the French team Limoges ABC.
