= Jim Shreve =

American football, basketball, and lacrosse coach (1926–2018)

Biographical details
- Born: August 27, 1926; Plainfield, New Jersey, U.S.
- Died: December 29, 2018; Lansdale, Pennsylvania, U.S.

Playing career

Football
- 1948–1950: Syracuse

Basketball
- 1948–1951: Syracuse
- Position: Defensive back (football)

Coaching career (HC unless noted)

Football
- 1951–1954: Moravian
- 1955–1956: George Washington (off. backs)
- 1957–1958: Lehigh (backfield)
- 1959–1968: Syracuse (freshmen)
- 1969–1972: Syracuse (RB)
- 1973: Iowa State (QB/RB)
- 1974–1977: Canastota HS (NY)
- 1977–1983: Cornell (WR)

Basketball
- 1955–1957: Syracuse (assistant)

Baseball
- 1956: George Washington (assistant)

Lacrosse
- 1959: Lehigh

Head coaching record
- Overall: 10–20–1 (college football)

James R. Shreve (August 27, 1926 – December 29, 2018) was an American football, basketball, and lacrosse coach. He served as the head coach at Moravian College in Bethlehem, Pennsylvania from 1951 to 1954, compiling a record of 10–20–1. Shrive also served as an assistant coach at Syracuse University where he was a member of the school's 1959 national championship staff. He also served as the head coach for Syracuse freshman football team, then called theTangerines.

Raised in Scotch Plains, New Jersey, Shreve graduated from Scotch Plains-Fanwood High School in 1945.

== Head coaching record ==
=== College football ===
Year	Team	Overall	Conference	Standing	Bowl/playoffs
Moravian Greyhounds (Independent) (1951–1954)
1951	Moravian	0–7–1			
1952	Moravian	1–7			
1953	Moravian	3–4			
1954	Moravian	6–2			
Moravian:		10–20–1			
Total:		10–20–1			
