= Philadelphia Sports Writers Association =

The Philadelphia Sports Writers Association (PSWA) was founded on May 12, 1904, in Philadelphia, Pennsylvania. The first of what would become an annual Awards Dinner was held on February 15, 1905.

== Awards ==
Each year, awards are presented—for the preceding calendar year—in the following categories: Outstanding Pro Athlete and/or Outstanding Philadelphia Pro Athlete of the Year (formerly Pro Athlete), Outstanding Amateur Athlete, Team of the Year, Outstanding Penn Relays collegiate performer (Frank Dolson/Penn Relays Award), Living Legend, Native Son, Humanitarian, Good Guy Award, and Most Courageous Athlete. The name of the Most Courageous Athlete recipient is kept secret until the night of the dinner.

In 2012, the Humanitarian award was presented to Ed Snider and renamed in his honor as the Ed Snider Lifetime Distinguished Humanitarian Award.

In 2015, two new awards were begun: the Bill Campbell Broadcast Award and the Stan Hochman Award (for that year's best sports story in the region).

In some years, awards are given in other categories: Executive of the Year, Nostalgia Team, Lifetime Achievement, Special Achievement, and Special Recognition.

== Award winners ==
=== 1970–1979 ===
1977

- Most Courageous Athlete – Tommy John (MLB)

1978

- Good Guy Award – Tim McCarver (Phillies)

1979

- Good Guy Award – Ron Jaworski (Eagles)
- Most Courageous Athlete – Bobby Clarke (Flyers)

=== 1980–1989 ===
1980

- Good Guy Award – Tug McGraw (Phillies)

1981

- Good Guy Award – Julius Erving (76ers)

1982

- Good Guy Award – Bobby Clarke (Flyers)

1983

- Good Guy Award – Al Holland (Phillies)

1984

• Outstanding Amateur Athlete Award - Jockey Tony Vega

1984

- Good Guy Award – Greg Gross (Phillies)
- Most Courageous Athlete – Scott Hamilton (figure skating)

1985

- Good Guy Award – John Spagnola (Eagles)

1986

- Living Legend – Chuck Bednarik (Eagles)
- Good Guy Award – Glenn Wilson (Phillies)
- Most Courageous Athlete – Jim Abbott (MLB)

1987

- Good Guy Award – Dave Poulin (Flyers)

1988

- Good Guy Award – Mark Howe (Flyers)

1989

- Good Guy Award – Ron Heller (Eagles)

=== 1990–1999 ===
1990

- Good Guy Award – Wes Hopkins (Eagles)

1991

- Good Guy Award – Ron Anderson (76ers)
- Most Courageous Athlete – Tim Kerr (Flyers)

1992

- Living Legend – Tommy McDonald (Eagles)
- Good Guy Award – Mike Golic (Eagles)

1993

- Good Guy Award – Curt Schilling (Phillies)

1994

- Good Guy Award – Herschel Walker (Eagles)

1995

- Good Guy Award – Mickey Morandini (Phillies)

1996

- Good Guy Award – Ricky Bottalico (Phillies)

1997

- Good Guy Award – Rico Brogna (Phillies)
- Most Courageous – Terry-Jo Myers (golf)

1998

- Good Guy Award – Michael Zordich (Eagles)

1999

- Good Guy Award – Ron Hextall (Flyers)
- Most Courageous – Jay Sigel (golf)

=== 2000–2009 ===
2000

- Living Legend – Pete Rose (Phillies)
- Good Guy Award – Doug Glanville (Phillies)

2001

- Good Guy Award – Rick Tocchet (Flyers)

2002

- Good Guy Award – Jeremy Roenick (Flyers)

2003

- Good Guy Award – Keith Primeau (Flyers)
- Most Courageous – Neil Parry (San Jose State; football)

2004

- Good Guy Award – Jim Thome (Phillies)

2005

- Good Guy Award – Simon Gagné (Flyers)
- Most Courageous – Macharia Yuot (Widener University; track/cross country)

2006

- Good Guy Award – Chris Coste (Phillies)
- Most Courageous – April Holmes (track and field)

==== 2007 ====
The awardees were honored at the PSWA's 104th Awards Dinner on January 28, 2008.

- Outstanding Pro Athlete – Jimmy Rollins (Phillies)
- Outstanding Amateur Athlete – Matt Ryan (Boston College; football)
- Team of the Year – Philadelphia Phillies
- Living Legend – Harry Kalas (Phillies broadcaster)
- Native Son – Carli Lloyd
- Humanitarian – Jon Runyan (Eagles)
- Good Guy Award – Daniel Brière (Flyers)
- Frank Dolson/Penn Relays Award – Anna Willard
- Nostalgia Team – Immaculata “Mighty Macs”
- Lifetime Achievement – Larry Shenk (Phillies public-relations director)
- Special Achievement – Kerry Fraser (NHL referee)
- Special Achievement – Herb Magee (Philadelphia University basketball coach)
- Special Achievement – Philadelphia Kixx
- Most Courageous – Lois Gilmore (long distance runner)

==== 2008 ====
The awardees were honored at the 105th Awards Dinner on January 26, 2009.

- Outstanding Pro Athlete – Brad Lidge (Phillies)
- Outstanding Amateur Athlete – Mike Washington (West Chester University; football)
- Team of the Year – Philadelphia Phillies
- Living Legend – Bernie Parent (Flyers)
- Native Son – Cuttino Mobley
- Humanitarian – Adam Taliaferro (Penn State; football)
- Good Guy Award – Sheldon Brown (Eagles)
- Frank Dolson/Penn Relays Award – LaTavia Thomas
- Lifetime Achievement – Steve Sabol (NFL Films)
- Special Achievement – Harvey Pollack (76ers director of statistical information)
- Most Courageous – Nicole Hester (Drexel University; women's basketball)

==== 2009 ====
The awardees were honored at the 106th Awards Dinner on February 1, 2010.

- Outstanding Professional Athlete – Brent Celek (Eagles)
- Outstanding Amateur Athlete – Gabriela Marginean (Drexel; women's basketball)
- Team of the Year – Philadelphia Phillies
- Frank Dolson Award (Penn Relays) – Sarah Bowman (Tennessee)
- Executive of the Year – Rubén Amaro, Jr. (Phillies)
- Living Legend – Red Klotz (Washington Generals)
- Native Son – Andrew Bailey (Oakland Athletics)
- Humanitarian – Dickie Noles (Phillies)
- Good Guy Award – Willie Green (76ers)
- Special Achievement – Jay Wright (Villanova; men's basketball)
- Special Achievement – Andy Talley (Villanova; football)
- Special Achievement – Gina Procaccio (Villanova; women's cross country)
- Special Achievement – Bob Nydick (Rivershark Twins; fastpitch softball)
- Special Achievement – Penn State Women's Volleyball (national champions)
- Special Recognition – 1960 Philadelphia Eagles (NFL champions)
- Special Recognition – 1985 Villanova Basketball (NCAA champions)
- Most Courageous Athlete – Frances Koons (Villanova)

=== 2010–2014 ===
==== 2010 ====
The awardees were honored at the 107th Awards Dinner on January 31, 2011.

- Pro Athlete of the Year – Roy Halladay (Phillies)
- Outstanding Amateur Athlete – Sheila Reid (Villanova cross country)
- Team of the Year – 2009–10 Philadelphia Flyers
- Frank Dolson Award (Penn Relays) – Gabby Mayo (Texas A&M women's track)
- Living Legend – Bill Bergey (Eagles)
- Native Son – Bobby Convey (San Jose Earthquakes (MLS), William Penn Charter School)
- Humanitarian – Shane Victorino (Phillies)
- Good Guy Athlete – Elton Brand (76ers)
- Special Achievement – Al Bagnoli (Penn football coach)
- Special Achievement – Jack Childs (Drexel wrestling coach)
- Special Achievement – Fran Dunphy (Temple basketball coach)
- Special Achievement – Herb Magee (Philadelphia University basketball coach)
- Special Achievement – Matt Hoffman (Rowan football)
- Special Achievement – Gina Procaccio (Villanova cross country)
- Army-Navy MVP – Wyatt Middleton (Navy football)
- Most Courageous Athlete – Mark Herzlich (Conestoga, Boston College)

==== 2011 ====
The awardees were honored at the 108th Awards Dinner on January 30, 2012.

- Pro Athlete of the Year – Claude Giroux (Flyers)
- Outstanding Amateur Athlete – Sheila Reid (Villanova University track and cross-country All-American)
- Team of the Year – 2011 Philadelphia Phillies
- Penn Relays Frank Dolson Award – Robby Andrews (University of Virginia)
- Living Legend – Herb Magee (Philadelphia University basketball coach)
- Native Son – Ryan Vogelsong (San Francisco Giants)
- Humanitarian of the Year – Andy Talley (Villanova University football coach)
- Good Guy of the Year – Hunter Pence Phillies)
- Special Achievement – Sébastien Le Toux (Philadelphia Union)
- Special Achievement – Bill Manlove (Widener University football coach)
- Special Achievement – Charlie Manuel (Phillies manager)
- Special Achievement – Harry Perretta (Villanova University women's basketball coach)
- Special Achievement – Cheryl Reeve (WNBA Coach of the Year)
- Most Courageous Athlete – Anthony Robles (Arizona State wrestling)

==== 2012 ====
The awardees were honored at the 109th Awards Dinner on January 28, 2013.

- Pro Athlete of the Year – Mike Trout (Los Angeles Angels and Millville High School)
- Living Legend – Larry Bowa (former Phillies shortstop and manager)
- Ed Snider Lifetime Distinguished Humanitarian Award – Ed Snider (Philadelphia Flyers founder and Comcast-Spectacor chairman)
- Army/Navy Game MVP – Keenan Reynolds (Navy freshman quarterback)
- Special Achievement – Jimmy Rollins (Philadelphia Phillies)
- Special Achievement – Speedy Morris (former basketball coach at La Salle University and St. Joseph's Prep)
- Special Achievement – Hank Nichols (basketball referee and Naismith Hall of Fame inductee)
- Most Courageous Athlete – Mario Tobia (blind golfer)

==== 2013 ====
The awardees were honored at the 110th Awards Dinner on January 27, 2014.

- Philadelphia Pro Athlete – Danny García (Light welterweight boxer: Undefeated light Welterweight Champion)
- Outstanding National Pro Athlete – LeSean McCoy (Philadelphia Eagles running back)
- Native Son – Bo Ryan (head coach of the University of Wisconsin–Madison Badgers men's basketball team)
- Living Legend – Bill Barber (former Philadelphia Flyers forward)
- Athlete Good Guy – Jason Avant (Philadelphia Eagles receiver)
- Team of the Year – Boston Red Sox
- Amateur Athlete – Rondell White (West Chester University running back)
- Lifetime Achievement Award – Bernard Hopkins (Middleweight Boxer: multi champion/belt holder)
- Ed Snider Lifetime Distinguished Humanitarian – Jim Murray (former Philadelphia Eagles general manager, founder of the Eagles Fly for Leukemia campaign, founder of first Ronald McDonald House)
- Penn Relays Frank Dolson Award – Emily Lipari (Villanova University)
- Army/Navy Game MVP – Keenan Reynolds (Navy quarterback)
- 1973 & 1974 Stanley Cup Commemoration – Bernie Parent & Bob Clarke (former Philadelphia Flyers goalie and former Philadelphia Flyers captain)
- Special Achievement – Wayne Hardin (Temple University & Naval Academy football coach, College Football Hall of Fame inductee)
- Special Achievement – Tim Van Liew (Rutgers-Camden track & field: javelin)
- Special Achievement – Denise Dillon (Head Coach, Drexel University women's basketball)
- Special Achievement – Jay Greenberg (Philadelphia Flyers beat writer, Hockey Hall of Fame inductee)
- Special Achievement – Eastern High School Field Hockey (14 straight N.J. state field hockey championships and this year won N.J. Tournament of Champions)

=== 2015–2019 ===
2015

The awardees were honored at the 112th annual awards dinner on February 1, 2016

- Athlete of the Year – Carli Lloyd (U.S. national women's soccer; Delran H.S. and Rutgers)
- Outstanding Philadelphia Pro Athlete – Jakub Voráček (Philadelphia Flyers winger)
- Outstanding Amateur Athlete – Tyler Matakevich (Temple Owls football All-American linebacker)
- Team of the Year – Temple Owls football
- Living Legend – Larry Holmes (former heavyweight boxing champion; Easton, Pa.)
- Native Son – Jahri Evans (New Orleans Saints offensive lineman); Frankford H.S. and Bloomsburg State)
- Ed Snider Lifetime Distinguished Humanitarian – David Montgomery (Philadelphia Phillies chairman)
- Army–Navy MVP – Keenan Reynolds (Navy)
- Good Guy Award – Brett Brown (Philadelphia 76ers head coach)
- Bill Campbell Broadcast Award – Merrill Reese (Philadelphia Eagles broadcaster)
- Stan Hochman Award (best sports story in the region) – Mike Sielski (The Philadelphia Inquirer)
- Special Achievement – Herb Magee (Philadelphia University; in 2015, became the second NCAA men's basketball coach to register 1,000 wins)
- Special Achievement – Reece Whitley (Penn Charter H.S. sophomore; has set 6 national swimming records for his age group)
- Most Courageous Athlete – Richard Suarez (Rowan University, baseball)

2016

The awardees are to be honored at the 113th annual awards dinner on February 3, 2017.

- Stan Hochman Award (best sports story in the region) – Jeff McLane (The Philadelphia Inquirer)
- Bill Campbell Broadcast Award – Scott Franzke and Larry Andersen (Philadelphia Phillies announcers)
- Most Courageous - Bill Lyon, Philadelphia Inquirer Sports Columnist

== See also ==
- Pennsylvania Sportswriter of the Year
- Local recipients of J. G. Taylor Spink Award (baseball writers)
- National Sports Media Association
- Sports in Philadelphia
- Daily News Sportsperson of the Year
- Philadelphia Sports Hall of Fame
- Philadelphia Eagles § Awards and honors
- List of Philadelphia Flyers award winners § Philadelphia Sports Writers Association
- List of Philadelphia Phillies award winners and league leaders § Other achievements
- Philadelphia 76ers § Individual awards
