= Mid-Town Historic District (Elizabeth, New Jersey) =

Historic district in Elizabeth, New Jersey, U.S.

- U.S. National Register of Historic Places
- U.S. Historic district
- New Jersey Register of Historic Places
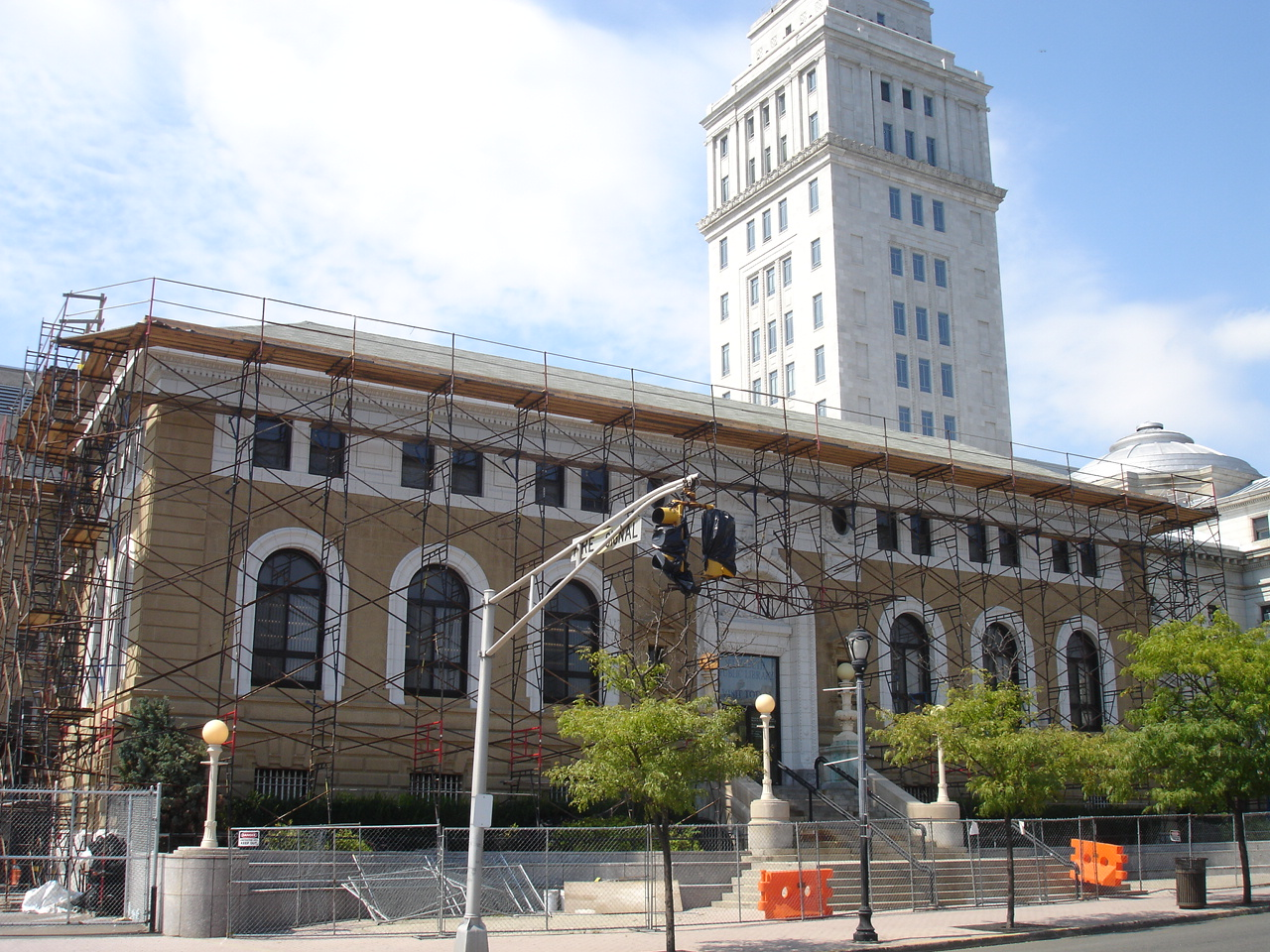

- Location within Union County, New Jersey Location within New Jersey Location within the United States
- Coordinates: 40°40′4″N 74°12′54″W
- Area: 55 acres (22 ha)
- NRHP reference No.: 95001143
- NJRHP No.: 2665

Significant dates
- Added to NRHP: October 5, 1995
- Designated NJRHP: September 29, 1994

The Mid-Town Historic District is a 55-acre (22 ha) historic district in the central business district of Elizabeth, in Union County, New Jersey. It was added to the National Register of Historic Places on October 5, 1995, for its significance in architecture, art, commerce, community planning, politics, religion, and transportation. The district encompasses 2-210 and 1-233 Broad St.; 251-339 North Broad Street; 1190-1214 and 1201-1217 East Grand St.; 1125-1169 and 1140-1170 East Jersey Street, and parts of Dickinson Street, Commerce Place, Elizabeth Avenue, and Martin Luther King Plaza. It has 117 contributing buildings including the Elizabeth Public Library, the Ritz Theatre and the individually listed First Presbyterian Church of Elizabeth and Elizabeth station.

== Buildings ==
Elizabeth is the fourth largest city by population in New Jersey and the seat of Union County. Located 5 miles south of Newark, Elizabeth has never developed a sizeable skyline, though mid-rises built before and during the Great Depression characterize the Mid-Town Historic District in the core of the city's central business district.

Rank	Name	Address	image	Height ft/m	Floors	Year	Notes
1	Union County Courthouse	2 Broad Street		238 ft (73 m)	17	1931	Neo classical
2	Ralph Oriscello Correctional Facility	15 Elizabethtown Plaza		174 ft (53 m)	14		
3	Hersch Tower	125-129 Broad Street		140 ft (43 m)	14	1931	Art Deco
4	Ritz Theatre & Performing Arts Center	1148 East Jersey Street		75 ft (23 m)	3	1926	Art Deco; restored as a live performing arts venue in 1994
5	St. John's Episcopal Church	Broad Street		125 ft (38 m)	n/a	1860	
6	Winfield Scott Tower	321-325 North Broad Street		117 ft (36 m)	11	1928	Spanish Colonial Revival
7	Albender Building	1143-1145 East Jersey Street		110 ft (34 m)	11	1928	Neo classical
8	Amber Court	1153-1155 East Jersey Street		112 ft (34 m)	9	1928	Formerly Elizabeth Cateret Hotel; Renaissance Revival
9	Union County Jail	13-17 Elizabethtown Plaza		112 ft (34 m)	9	1931	

== See also ==
- Belcher-Ogden Mansion-Price, Benjamin-Price-Brittan Houses District
- National Register of Historic Places listings in Union County, New Jersey
- Midtown Station
- Thomas Jefferson Arts Academy
