= National Register of Historic Places listings in Union County, New Jersey =

Location of Union County in New Jersey

List of the National Register of Historic Places listings in Union County, New Jersey

Contents: Counties and communities in New Jersey
Atlantic – Bergen (Closter, Franklin Lakes, Ridgewood, Saddle River, Wyckoff) – Burlington – Camden – Cape May – Cumberland – Essex – Gloucester – Hudson – Hunterdon – Mercer – Middlesex – Monmouth – Morris – Ocean – Passaic – Salem – Somerset – Sussex – Union – Warren

This is intended to be a complete list of properties and districts listed on the National Register of Historic Places in Union County, New Jersey. Latitude and longitude coordinates of the sites listed on this page may be displayed in an online map.

This National Park Service list is complete through NPS recent listings posted May 1, 2026.

	Name on the Register	Image	Date listed	Location	City or town	Description
1	All Souls Church	All Souls Church	December 11, 2009 (#09001078)	724 Park Avenue; 40°36′51″N 74°24′58″W	Plainfield	Plainfield Performing Arts Center
2	Badgley House and Site	Badgley House and Site	September 27, 1976 (#76001190)	North of Mountainside off New Providence Rd., Watchung Reservation; 40°40′59″N 74°22′37″W	Mountainside	Destroyed by fire in 1984
3	Baltusrol Golf Club	Baltusrol Golf Club	May 6, 2005 (#05000374)	201 Shunpike Road; 40°42′18″N 74°19′41″W	Springfield	The courses designed 1918–26 brought architect A. W. Tillinghast to prominence as a course designer; club has been host to many men's and women's majors since then.
4	Belcher-Ogden Mansion, Benjamin Price House, and Price-Brittan House Historic District	Belcher-Ogden Mansion, Benjamin Price House, and Price-Brittan House Historic District	August 28, 1986 (#86001969)	Corner of East Jersey and Catherine Streets; 40°39′48″N 74°12′32″W	Elizabeth	Includes Belcher–Ogden House
5	Belcher–Ogden House	Belcher–Ogden House	November 2, 1978 (#78001799)	1046 East Jersey Street; 40°39′47″N 74°12′33″W	Elizabeth	Also known as Governor Jonathan Belcher Mansion
6	Boxwood Hall	Boxwood Hall	December 18, 1970 (#70000397)	1073 E. Jersey St. 40°39′49″N 74°12′37″W	Elizabeth	
7	Burial Ground of the Presbyterian Church in the West Fields of Elizabethtown	Burial Ground of the Presbyterian Church in the West Fields of Elizabethtown	October 25, 2007 (#07001108)	W. side of Mountain Ave. N. of Drift Way opposite 140 Mountain Ave. 40°39′12″N 74°20′57″W	Westfield	
8	Caldwell Parsonage	Caldwell Parsonage	August 12, 1982 (#82004785)	909 Caldwell Ave. 40°41′42″N 74°16′43″W	Union	
9	Cedar Brook Park	Cedar Brook Park	August 28, 2007 (#07000878)	Roughly bounded Stelle Ave., Arlington Ave., Park Ave., Rose St. and Laramie Rd., Kenyon Ave., Parkside Rd. 40°36′05″N 74°24′25″W	Plainfield	Extends into South Plainfield, Middlesex County
10	Central Railroad of New Jersey	Central Railroad of New Jersey	July 17, 1980 (#80002521)	238 North Avenue; 40°38′46″N 74°21′43″W	Fanwood	Known as Fanwood station
11	Crane-Phillips House	Crane-Phillips House	August 14, 1997 (#97000842)	125 N. Union Ave. 40°39′27″N 74°17′26″W	Cranford	
12	Crescent Area Historic District	Crescent Area Historic District	December 12, 1980 (#80002523)	Roughly bounded by Park, Prospect, and Carnegie Aves., 7th and Richmond Sts. 40°36′59″N 74°24′49″W	Plainfield	
13	John De Camp House	John De Camp House	December 4, 1973 (#73001136)	2101 Raritan Rd. 40°37′38″N 74°20′27″W	Scotch Plains	
14	Nathaniel Drake House	Nathaniel Drake House	June 19, 1973 (#73001135)	602 W. Front St. 40°36′49″N 74°25′56″W	Plainfield	
15	Droescher's Mill	Droescher's Mill	January 8, 1974 (#74001192)	347 Lincoln Avenue East; 40°39′01″N 74°18′06″W	Cranford	
16	Elizabeth Station	Elizabeth Station	September 29, 1984 (#84002825)	Morris Ave., and Broad St. 40°40′01″N 74°13′01″W	Elizabeth	part of the Operating Passenger Railroad Stations TR
17	Evergreen Cemetery	Evergreen Cemetery	July 9, 1991 (#91000882)	1137 N. Broad St. 40°41′32″N 74°12′39″W	Hillside and Elizabeth	
18	Fanwood Park Historic District	Fanwood Park Historic District	May 27, 2004 (#04000516)	North Avenue and North Martine Avenue; 40°38′39″N 74°23′21″W	Fanwood	Includes Fanwood station
19	Feltville Historic District	Feltville Historic District	June 6, 1980 (#80002522)	South of New Providence; 40°40′53″N 74°23′16″W	New Providence	
20	Firehouse No. 4	Firehouse No. 4	March 11, 1993 (#93000133)	1015 South Ave. 40°37′42″N 74°24′14″W	Plainfield	
21	Elizabeth and Gershom Frazee House	Elizabeth and Gershom Frazee House	December 7, 2009 (#09000971)	1451 Raritan Road; 40°37′00″N 74°22′02″W	Scotch Plains	
22	First Congregation of the Presbyterian Church at Springfield	First Congregation of the Presbyterian Church at Springfield	May 7, 1990 (#90000668)	201 Morris Ave. and 11-41 Church Mall; 40°42′41″N 74°18′39″W	Springfield	
23	First Presbyterian Church of Elizabeth	First Presbyterian Church of Elizabeth	May 6, 1977 (#77000914)	14-44 Broad St. 40°39′45″N 74°12′56″W	Elizabeth	
24	First Presbyterian Congregation of Connecticut Farms	First Presbyterian Congregation of Connecticut Farms	April 3, 1970 (#70000398)	Stuyvesant Ave. at Chestnut St. 40°41′36″N 74°16′26″W	Union	
25	Charles N. Fowler House	Charles N. Fowler House	March 13, 1986 (#86000389)	518 Salem Ave. 40°40′35″N 74°12′53″W	Elizabeth	
26	Grace Episcopal Church	Grace Episcopal Church	May 10, 2002 (#02000106)	600 Cleveland Avenue; 40°37′05″N 74°25′02″W	Plainfield	
27	Green Brook Park	Green Brook Park	May 14, 2004 (#04000437)	All parkland from Clinton Ave. to west of West End Ave., and the junction of Lawrence and Parkview Ave., Fisk and Townsend Pls. 40°36′30″N 74°26′43″W	Plainfield	Extends into North Plainfield, Somerset County
28	Deacon Andrew Hetfield House	Deacon Andrew Hetfield House	July 27, 1989 (#89001004)	Constitution Plaza; 40°40′19″N 74°21′29″W	Mountainside	
29	Hillside Avenue Historic District	Hillside Avenue Historic District	June 1, 1982 (#82003307)	Hillside Avenue from Watchung Avenue to Martine Avenue; 40°36′55″N 74°24′18″W	Plainfield	
30	Homestead Farm at Oak Ridge	Homestead Farm at Oak Ridge	October 25, 1995 (#95001185)	Junction of Oak Ridge Rd. and Feather Bed Ln., Clark and Edison Townships; 40°36′28″N 74°20′56″W	Clark	
31	Hutchings Homestead	Hutchings Homestead	September 16, 1977 (#77000915)	126 Morris Ave. 40°42′37″N 74°18′26″W	Springfield	
32	Littel–Lord Farmstead	Littel–Lord Farmstead	March 7, 1979 (#79001528)	23 and 31 Horseshoe Road; 40°40′05″N 74°25′41″W	Berkeley Heights	
33	William Livingston House	William Livingston House	November 28, 1972 (#72000807)	Morris and North Aves. 40°40′40″N 74°13′41″W	Union	Liberty Hall, Kean University
34	Merchants and Drovers Tavern	Merchants and Drovers Tavern	November 21, 1978 (#78001801)	1632 St. Georges Avenue; 40°36′59″N 74°17′09″W	Rahway	
35	Mid-Town Historic District	Mid-Town Historic District	October 5, 1995 (#95001143)	Bounded by Broad, N. Broad, Dickinson, E. Grand, E. Jersey Sts., Commerce Place, Elizabeth Ave. and Martin L. King Plaza; 40°39′56″N 74°12′52″W	Elizabeth	image shows Elizabeth Public Library and Union County Courthouse
36	Miller-Cory House	Miller-Cory House	November 3, 1972 (#72000808)	614 Mountain Ave. 40°39′45″N 74°21′02″W	Westfield	
37	Murray Hill Station	Murray Hill Station	June 22, 1984 (#84002826)	The Circle; 40°41′41″N 74°24′13″W	Murray Hill	part of the Operating Passenger Railroad Stations TR
38	Netherwood Station	Netherwood Station	June 22, 1984 (#84002830)	Between North and South Aves. 40°37′45″N 74°24′13″W	Plainfield	part of the Operating Passenger Railroad Stations TR
39	Oswald J. Nitschke House	Oswald J. Nitschke House	January 17, 2008 (#07001406)	49 S. 21 St. 40°40′36″N 74°17′28″W	Kenilworth	
40	North Avenue Commercial District	North Avenue Commercial District	March 29, 1984 (#84002836)	Park, North, and Watchung Avenues; 40°37′07″N 74°25′17″W	Plainfield	
41	Old Baptist Parsonage	Old Baptist Parsonage	January 18, 1973 (#73001137)	547 Park Ave. 40°39′06″N 74°23′59″W	Scotch Plains	
42	Plainfield Central Fire Headquarters	Plainfield Central Fire Headquarters	March 4, 1993 (#93000131)	315 Central Ave. 40°36′54″N 74°25′26″W	Plainfield	
43	Plainfield Civic District	Plainfield Civic District	June 17, 1993 (#93000533)	Roughly, Watchung Ave. between E. Fifth and E. Seventh Sts. 40°37′03″N 74°25′03″W	Plainfield	
44	Plainfield Masonic Temple	Plainfield Masonic Temple	September 16, 2024 (#100010812)	105 East 7th Street; 40°36′55″N 74°25′02″W	Plainfield	
45	Plainfield Station	Plainfield Station	June 22, 1984 (#84002837)	North Ave. 40°37′06″N 74°25′15″W	Plainfield	part of the Operating Passenger Railroad Stations TR
46	Rahway Theatre	Rahway Theatre	August 13, 1986 (#86001509)	1601 Irving St. 40°36′37″N 74°16′39″W	Rahway	
47	William Edgar Reeve House	William Edgar Reeve House	February 1, 2006 (#05001565)	314 Mountain Ave. 40°39′34″N 74°20′58″W	Westfield	
48	Saint Mary's Catholic Church Complex	Saint Mary's Catholic Church Complex	April 11, 1985 (#85000785)	Liberty and W. 6th Sts. 40°36′39″N 74°25′26″W	Plainfield	
49	Sayre Homestead	Sayre Homestead	August 24, 1979 (#79001529)	Sayre Homestead Lane; 40°42′13″N 74°20′50″W	Springfield	
50	Scotch Plains Baptist Church, Parsonage, and Cemetery	Scotch Plains Baptist Church, Parsonage, and Cemetery	June 14, 2013 (#13000386)	333-334 Park Ave., 40°39′09″N 74°23′59″W	Scotch Plains	
51	Scotch Plains School	Scotch Plains School	December 12, 1978 (#78001802)	Park Ave. 40°38′58″N 74°23′47″W	Scotch Plains	Apparently demolished.
52	Seventeenth Century Clark House	Seventeenth Century Clark House	November 19, 1974 (#74001193)	593 Madison Hill Rd. 40°36′49″N 74°18′36″W	Clark	
53	Shady Rest Golf and Country Club	Shady Rest Golf and Country Club	July 7, 2022 (#100007869)	820 Jerusalem Road; 40°39′22″N 74°22′20″W	Scotch Plains	
54	Nathaniel Smith House	Nathaniel Smith House	September 28, 1989 (#89001584)	105 Springfield Ave. 40°41′33″N 74°25′47″W	Berkeley Heights	
55	St. John's Parsonage	St. John's Parsonage	September 16, 1982 (#82003306)	633 Pearl St. 40°39′37″N 74°12′45″W	Elizabeth	
56	Stage House Inn	Stage House Inn	April 15, 1982 (#82003308)	intersection of Park Avenue and Front Street; 40°39′03″N 74°23′59″W	Scotch Plains	
57	Stoneleigh Park Historic District	Stoneleigh Park Historic District	October 28, 1988 (#88002020)	Roughly bounded by Westfield Ave., Shackamaxon Dr., Rahway and Dorian Rd. 40°38′34″N 74°20′49″W	Westfield	
58	George A. Strong House	George A. Strong House	August 28, 2012 (#12000570)	1030 Central Avenue; 40°36′18″N 74°25′01″W	Plainfield	now the duCret School of Art
59	Summit Downtown Historic District	Summit Downtown Historic District	June 30, 2011 (#10001116)	Roughly bounded by Springfield Ave, the Village Green, Summit Ave, and Waldron Ave. 40°43′04″N 74°21′27″W	Summit	Civic and commercial core of early railroad suburb
60	Summit Playhouse	Summit Playhouse	December 30, 2009 (#09001177)	10 New England Ave. 40°42′54″N 74°21′55″W	Summit	
61	The Clearing	The Clearing	April 9, 1993 (#93000233)	165 Hobart Ave. 40°43′36″N 74°20′53″W	Summit	Now known as Reeves-Reed Arboretum
62	James Townley House	James Townley House	May 14, 1979 (#79001530)	Morris Ave. and Green Lane; 40°40′54″N 74°14′07″W	Union	On the campus of Kean University
63	Twin Maples	Twin Maples	August 29, 1997 (#97000977)	8 Edgewood Rd. 40°43′02″N 74°21′00″W	Summit	
64	Union County Park Commission Administration Buildings	Union County Park Commission Administration Buildings	November 25, 1985 (#85002976)	Acme and Canton Sts. 40°39′31″N 74°14′17″W	Elizabeth	
65	Van Wyck Brooks Historic District	Van Wyck Brooks Historic District	December 10, 1985 (#85003337)	Roughly bounded by Plainfield Ave., W. Eighth St., Park Ave., W. Ninth St. and Madison Ave., and Randolph Rd. 40°36′35″N 74°25′06″W	Plainfield	Named after the literary critic Van Wyck Brooks
66	Wallace Chapel AME Zion Church	Wallace Chapel AME Zion Church	August 28, 2007 (#07000877)	138-142 Broad St. 40°42′49″N 74°20′38″W	Summit	
67	Orville T. Waring House	Orville T. Waring House	May 14, 1979 (#79003252)	900 Park Avenue; 40°36′46″N 74°24′53″W	Plainfield	
68	Westfield Fire Headquarters	Westfield Fire Headquarters	December 8, 1980 (#80002524)	405 North Ave., W. 40°39′00″N 74°20′56″W	Westfield	
69	Whyman House	Whyman House	April 10, 1986 (#86000705)	705 Newark Ave. 40°40′49″N 74°12′29″W	Elizabeth	Demolished in 2020.
70	Woodruff House	Woodruff House	December 11, 1978 (#78001800)	111-113 Conant St. 40°41′14″N 74°13′12″W	Hillside	
71	Young Women's Christian Association of Plainfield and North Plainfield	Young Women's Christian Association of Plainfield and North Plainfield	March 12, 1998 (#98000232)	232 W. Front St. 40°37′15″N 74°25′16″W	Plainfield	
