= Belcher–Ogden Mansion; Benjamin Price House; and Price–Brittan House Historic District =

Historic district in New Jersey, United States

- U.S. National Register of Historic Places
- U.S. Historic district
- New Jersey Register of Historic Places
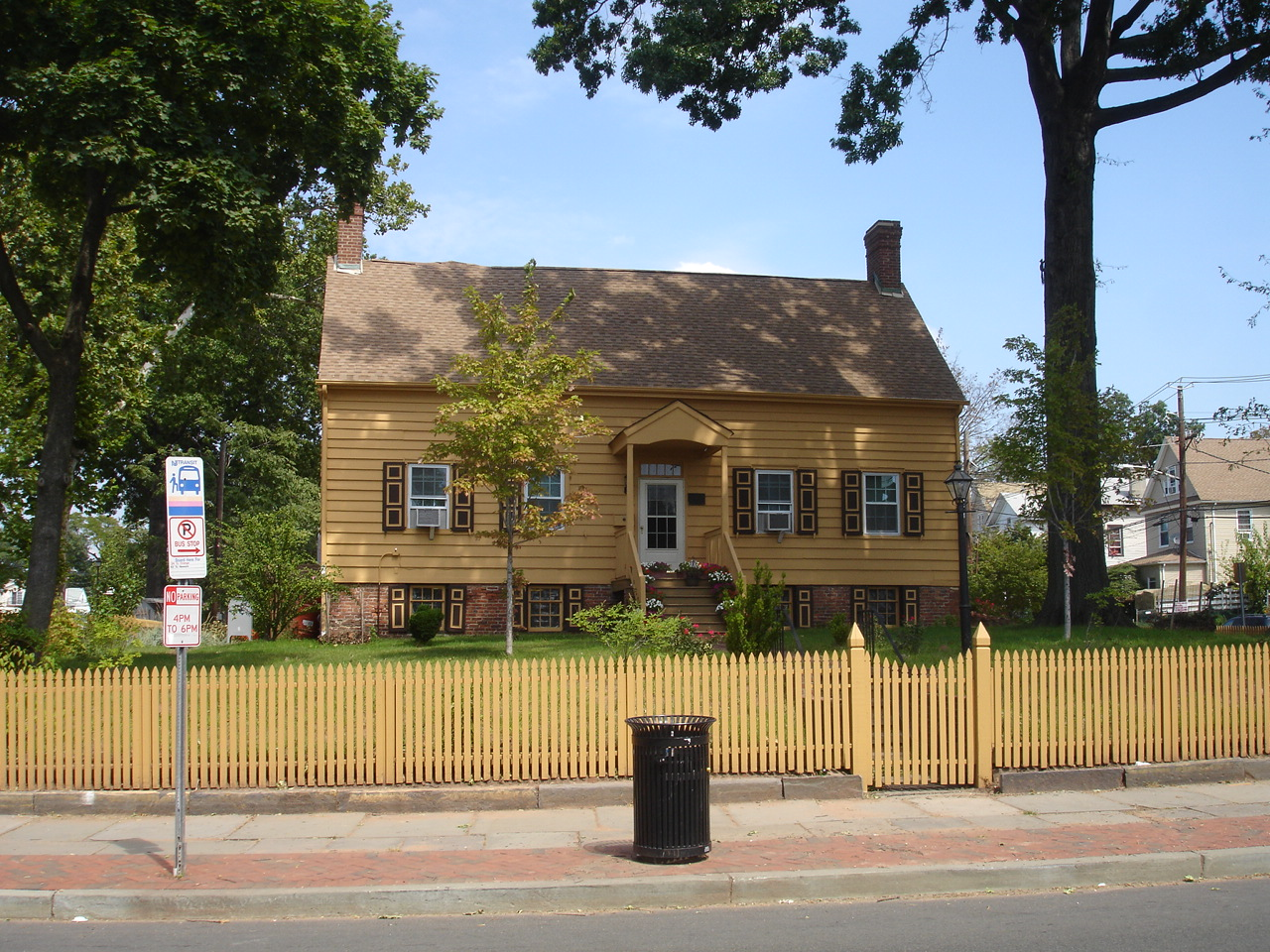
- The Nathaniel Bonnell House in fall 2011

- Location within Union County, New Jersey Location within New Jersey Location within the United States
- Location: Corner of East Jersey and Catherine Streets, Elizabeth, New Jersey
- Coordinates: 40°39′48″N 74°12′32″W
- Area: 0.75 acres (0.30 ha)
- NRHP reference No.: 86001969
- NJRHP No.: 2656

Significant dates
- Added to NRHP: August 28, 1986
- Designated NJRHP: June 25, 2007

The Belcher–Ogden Mansion; Benjamin Price House; and Price–Brittan House Historic District is a 0.75-acre (3,000 m^{2}) historic district located on East Jersey Street in Elizabeth, Union County, New Jersey, United States. It was added to the National Register of Historic Places on August 28, 1986, for its significance in architecture and exploration/settlement. It is located near Boxwood Hall and is in the heart of colonial Elizabethtown, the first English-speaking settlement in what became the Province of New Jersey.

== Belcher–Ogden House ==
- Belcher–Ogden House
- U.S. National Register of Historic Places
- New Jersey Register of Historic Places
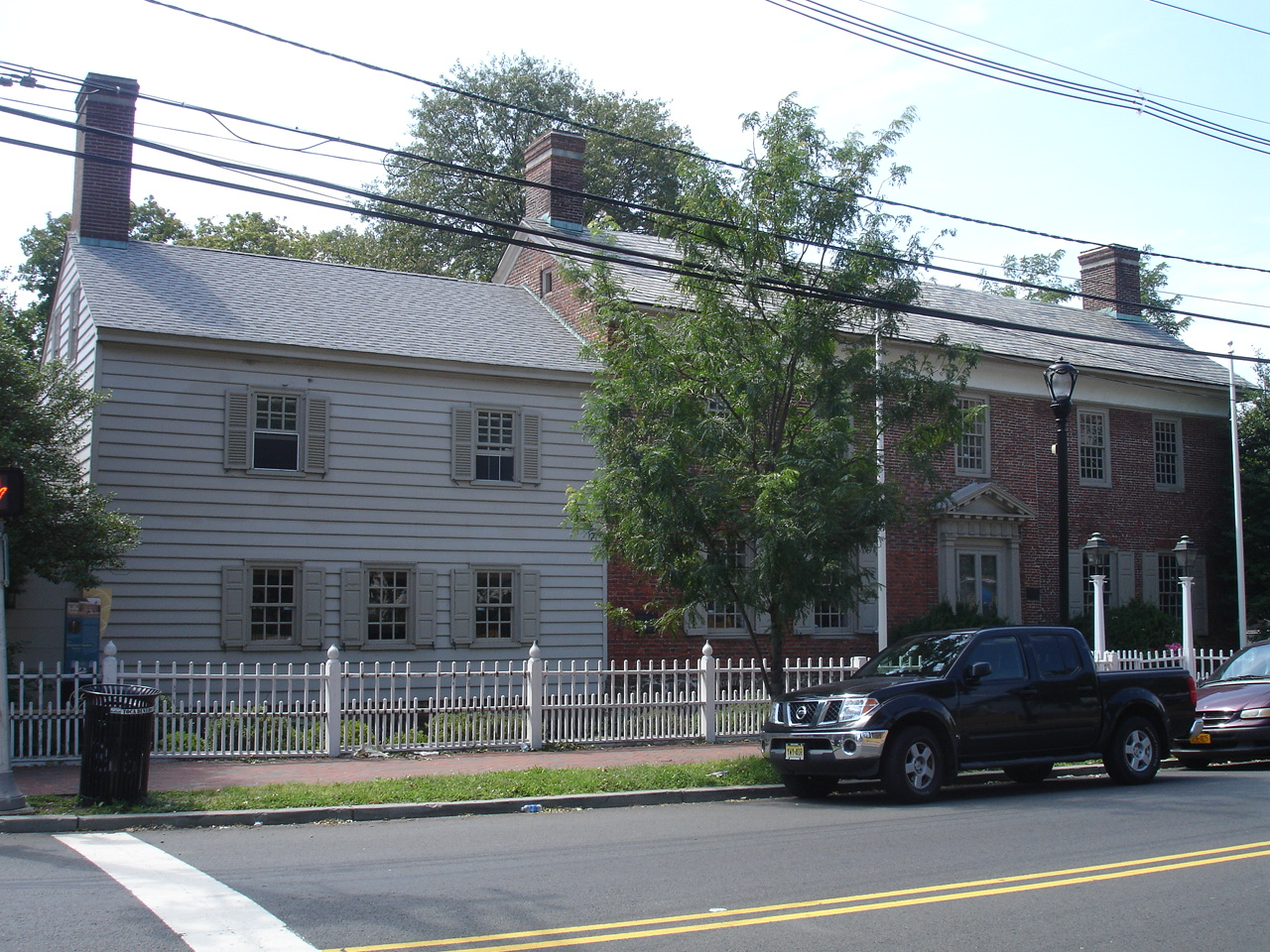
- The Belcher–Ogden Mansion in the fall of 2011
- Location: 1046 East Jersey Street, Elizabeth, New Jersey
- Coordinates: 40°39′47.5″N 74°12′33″W
- Built: 1742
- Architectural style: Georgian
- NRHP reference No.: 78001799
- NJRHP No.: 2655

Significant dates
- Added to NRHP: November 2, 1978
- Designated NJRHP: April 29, 1978

The Belcher–Ogden House, also known as the Governor Jonathan Belcher Mansion, at 1046 East Jersey Street was built in 1742 and documented by the Historic American Buildings Survey (HABS) in 1936. It was added to the National Register of Historic Places on November 2, 1978, for its significance in architecture and politics/government.

== Nathaniel Bonnell House ==
Nathaniel Bonnell House
- Interactive map of the Nathaniel Bonnell House area

General information
- Location: Elizabeth, New Jersey, 1045 East Jersey Street
- Coordinates: 40°39′48″N 74°12′32″W
- Construction started: c. 1670
- Completed: 1682

The Nathaniel Bonnell House, at 1045 East Jersey Street, is the oldest house in Elizabeth.

== See also ==
- National Register of Historic Places listings in Union County, New Jersey
- First Presbyterian Church of Elizabeth
- Jonathan Belcher
- Jonathan Belcher (jurist)
- Aaron Ogden
- List of museums in New Jersey
- List of the oldest buildings in New Jersey
