= Ritz Theatre & Performing Arts Center =

Performing arts center in New Jersey, US

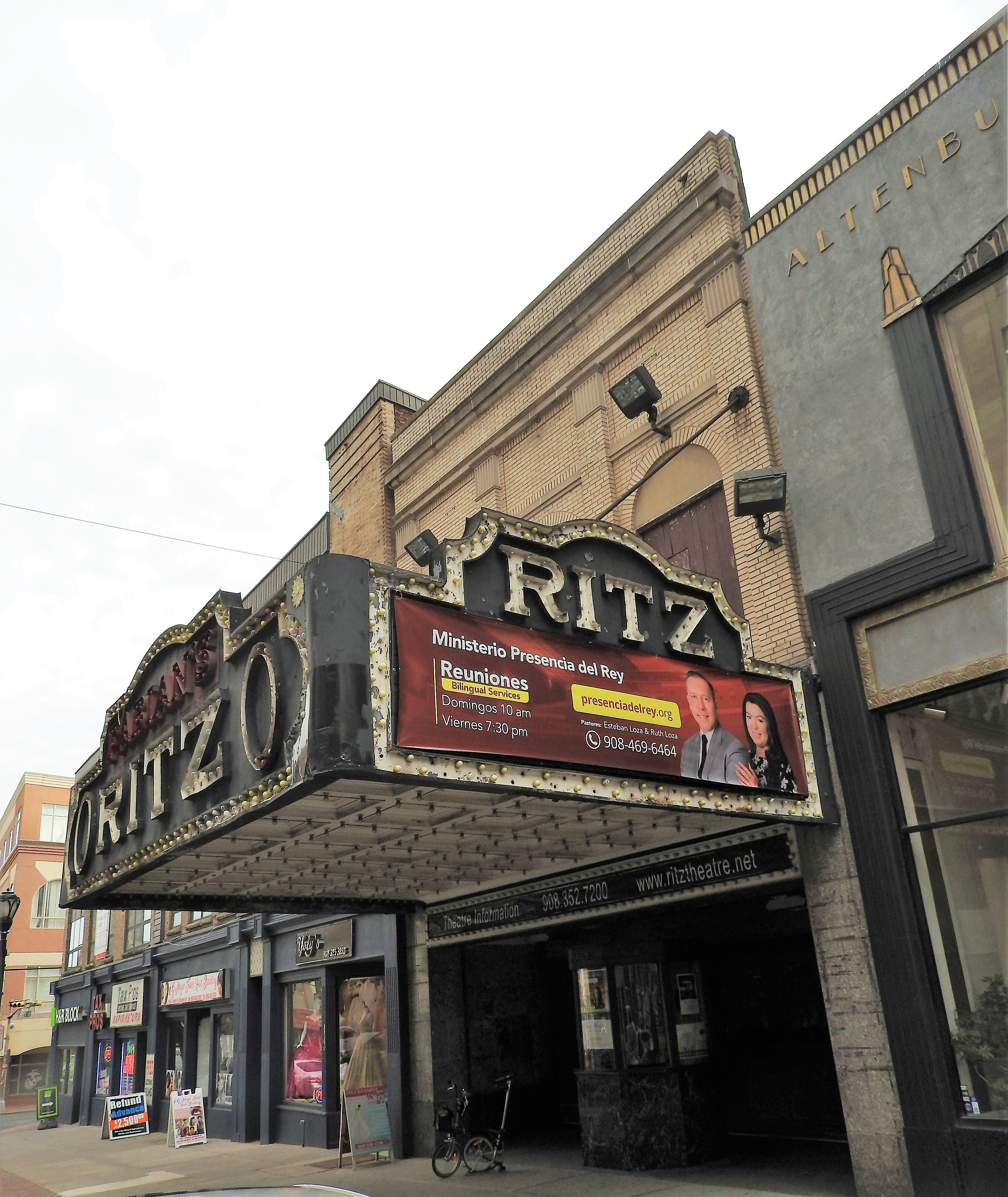
- Marquee of the Ritz Theatre
- Interactive map of Ritz Theatre & Performing Arts Center
- Location: 1148 East Jersey Street; Elizabeth, New Jersey
- Coordinates: 40.664707°N 74.213402°W
- Owner: George A. Castro II
- Operator: Ritz Theatre and Performing Arts Center
- Seating type: Fixed
- Capacity: 2,800
- Ritz Theatre
- U.S. Historic district – Contributing property
- New Jersey Register of Historic Places
- Location: 1148 East Jersey Street; Elizabeth, New Jersey
- Built: 1925–1926
- Architect: Fred Wesley Wentworth
- Architectural style: Art Deco
- Part of: Mid-Town Historic District (ID95001143)
- NJRHP No.: 37

Significant dates
- Designated CP: October 5, 1995
- Designated NJRHP: September 29, 1994
- Type: Performing arts center

Construction
- Opened: March 9, 1926
- Renovated: 1994

The Ritz Theatre & Performing Arts Center, also known as The Ritz Theatre or Castro's Ritz, is a historic performing arts venue in Elizabeth, New Jersey, located at 1148 East Jersey Street. Built in 1926 on the site of the 1865 Drake Opera House, the theatre was originally opened as a vaudeville and silent-film house. Designed by architect Fred Wesley Wentworth, it featured an ornate Art Deco interior and originally seated 2,791 patrons. During the mid-20th century, it continued as a movie palace until it was closed by RKO in 1979. Threatened with demolition by 1980, it was rescued by local preservationists in 1989, though funding fell short.

In 1994, the Ritz was purchased by real estate executive George A. Castro II, who led a major renovation to restore its 1920s grandeur. Today, it has a seating capacity of 2,800 and operates as a fully restored performing arts venue.

Situated near major transportation hubs, including Newark Liberty International Airport and the Elizabeth NJ Transit station, the Ritz Theatre is easily accessible to audiences from across the Tri-State Area, and frequently draws attendees from neighboring states. A public city-operated parking deck is located adjacent to the theater, providing convenient access for visitors. The venue has received over fourteen national accolades for acoustic excellence and is equipped with a state-of-the-art Clair Brothers sound system.

The theater's architectural design, which favors width over depth, has contributed to its reputation for exceptional acoustics. Its auditorium features a wide-format layout and a gently pitched floor, ensuring clear sightlines and favorable views from nearly every seat in the house. Currently the theatre serves as one of the most well-recognized concert venues in New Jersey.

The Ritz is a contributing property to the Mid-Town Historic District of Elizabeth, which was listed on the National Register of Historic Places in 1995.

== History ==
The site of the Ritz Theatre has hosted entertainment venues since the 19th century. The original Drake Opera House opened on the site in 1865. It was later known under several names, including People's Theatre, Star Theatre, Jacob's Theatre, and Proctor's Theatre, before being demolished in the 1920s. In 1925, Jacob Fabian purchased the property and commissioned architect Fred Wesley Wentworth to build a new theater. The Ritz Theatre opened on March 9, 1926, initially called "Fabian's Ritz." It had 2,791 seats and a lavish Art Deco auditorium.

By 1941, the Ritz was part of the Warner Bros. Circuit Management chain. It continued operating into the 1960s, but patronage declined by the 1970s, leading to its closure in 1979. In 1989, it was rescued by a group of preservationists, but restoration funding ran out. George A. Castro II purchased the theatre in 1994 and led a comprehensive renovation to reopen the venue as a performing arts center.

== Architecture ==
The Ritz Theatre was designed in an Art Deco style. Its exterior retains geometric ornamentation, while the restored interior features period details such as chandeliers, plaster moldings, and a proscenium stage. With 2,800 seats, it remains one of the largest and oldest operational theatres in New Jersey. The architect, Fred W. Wentworth, was renowned for designing early movie palaces in the state.

=== Notable performers and events ===
In its early days, the Ritz hosted acts such as Elvis Presley, Ray Charles, Johnny Cash, Maya Angelou, and members of the Rat Pack, including Frank Sinatra, Sammy Davis Jr., and Dean Martin. Other notable performers include George Burns, Jack Benny, Harry Chapin, Chaka Khan, Miles Davis, and Rodney Dangerfield.

It is regularly used as a filming location by NBC, HBO, Netflix, and Fox. The 2024 Bob Dylan biopic A Complete Unknown filmed scenes at the Ritz. The theatre hosts public viewings for major sporting events and cultural celebrations.

== Preservation and renovation efforts ==
The Ritz Theatre's inclusion in the National Register of Historic Places as part of the Midtown Historic District in 1995 marked an important milestone in its preservation. George Castro's restoration work in the 1990s, followed by infrastructure upgrades in the 2010s, ensured the theatre retained its 1920s charm while becoming a modern venue.

== Community and cultural impact ==
The Ritz plays a central role in Elizabeth's cultural life. It collaborates with city officials and local organizations to offer free events and cultural celebrations that reflect the city's diverse population.

== Recognition and media coverage ==
The Ritz Theatre has been featured in city tourism materials and local news. NJArts.net profiled its ongoing cultural impact and growing schedule of performances. The New York Times published a feature in 2005 documenting the building's restoration and renewed role in the community. The theatre has also drawn praise from historic preservationists and has appeared in documentaries and films. It is regularly described as a restored example of New Jersey's early 20th-century theater architecture.

== See also ==
- National Register of Historic Places listings in Union County, New Jersey
- List of Art Deco architecture in New Jersey
