= Scotch Plains School =

- U.S. National Register of Historic Places
- New Jersey Register of Historic Places
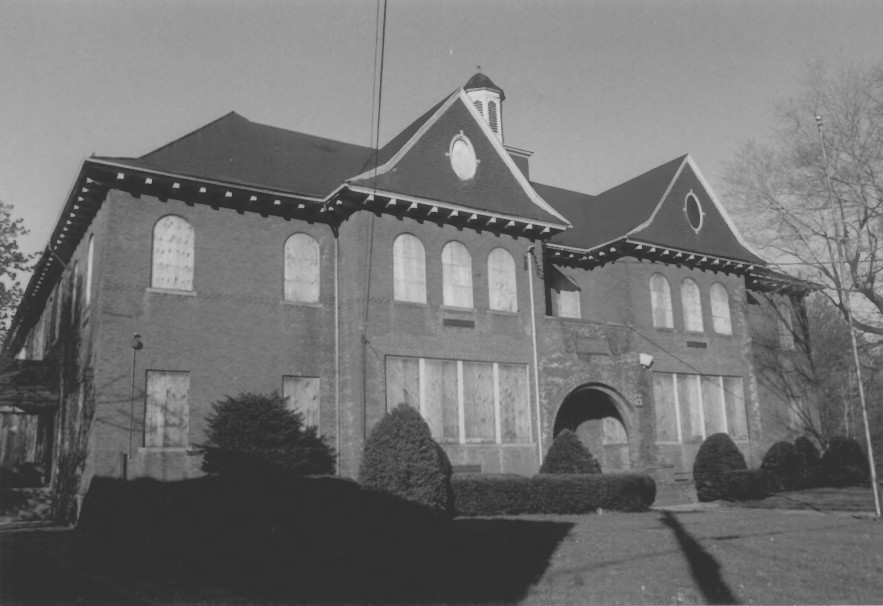

- Location within Union County, New Jersey Location within New Jersey Location within the United States
- Location: Park Avenue, Scotch Plains, New Jersey
- Coordinates: 40°38′58″N 74°23′47″W
- Area: 2 acres (0.81 ha)
- Built: 1890
- Architect: McKim, Mead, & White
- Architectural style: Renaissance
- NRHP reference No.: 78001802
- NJRHP No.: 2722

Significant dates
- Added to NRHP: December 12, 1978
- Designated NJRHP: October 12, 1978

The Scotch Plains School, or School #1, was located in Scotch Plains, Union County, New Jersey, United States. The school was built in 1890 and was added to the National Register of Historic Places on December 12, 1978.

Originally designed by Stanford White as an elementary school, it was repurposed as a high school within ten years of its opening. School One reverted to being an elementary school in 1926 and continued as such until its closing in 1974.

The school was burned down by an arsonist in 1984. It has since been demolished.

== See also ==
- National Register of Historic Places listings in Union County, New Jersey
