= Plainfield Central Fire Headquarters =

- U.S. National Register of Historic Places
- New Jersey Register of Historic Places
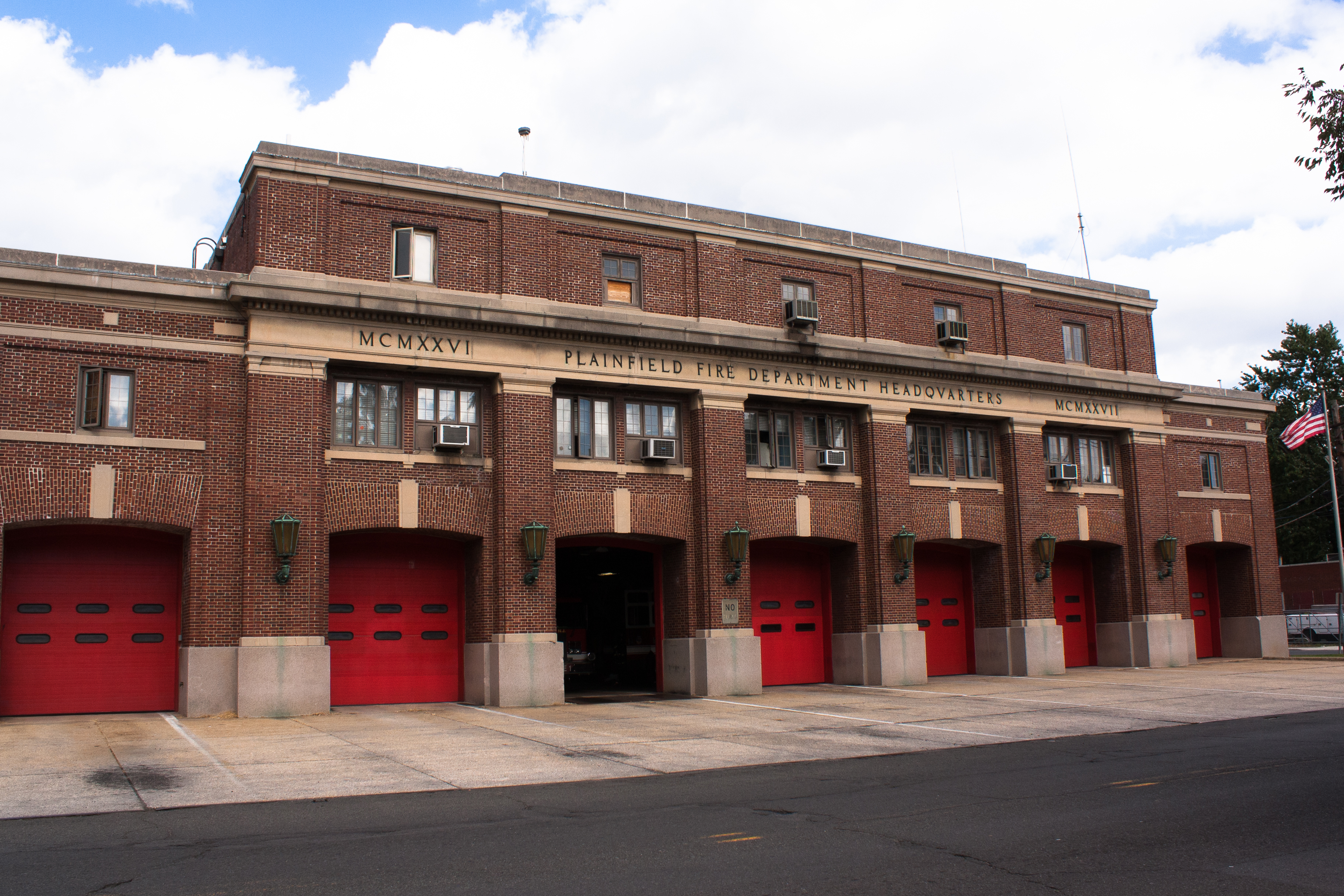

- Location within Union County, New Jersey Location within New Jersey Location within the United States
- Location: 315 Central Avenue, Plainfield, New Jersey
- Coordinates: 40°36′54″N 74°25′26″W
- Area: 0.6 acres (0.24 ha)
- Built: 1926
- Architect: Robinson, George Ernest
- Architectural style: Late 19th And 20th Century Revivals, Georgian Revival
- NRHP reference No.: 93000131
- NJRHP No.: 2693

Significant dates
- Added to NRHP: March 4, 1993
- Designated NJRHP: January 25, 1993

Plainfield Central Fire Headquarters is located in Plainfield, Union County, New Jersey, United States. The firehouse was built in 1926 and added to the National Register of Historic Places on March 4, 1993.

== See also ==
- National Register of Historic Places listings in Union County, New Jersey
