= Littel–Lord Farmstead =

Historic house in New Jersey, United States

- Littell–Lord Farmstead
- U.S. National Register of Historic Places
- New Jersey Register of Historic Places
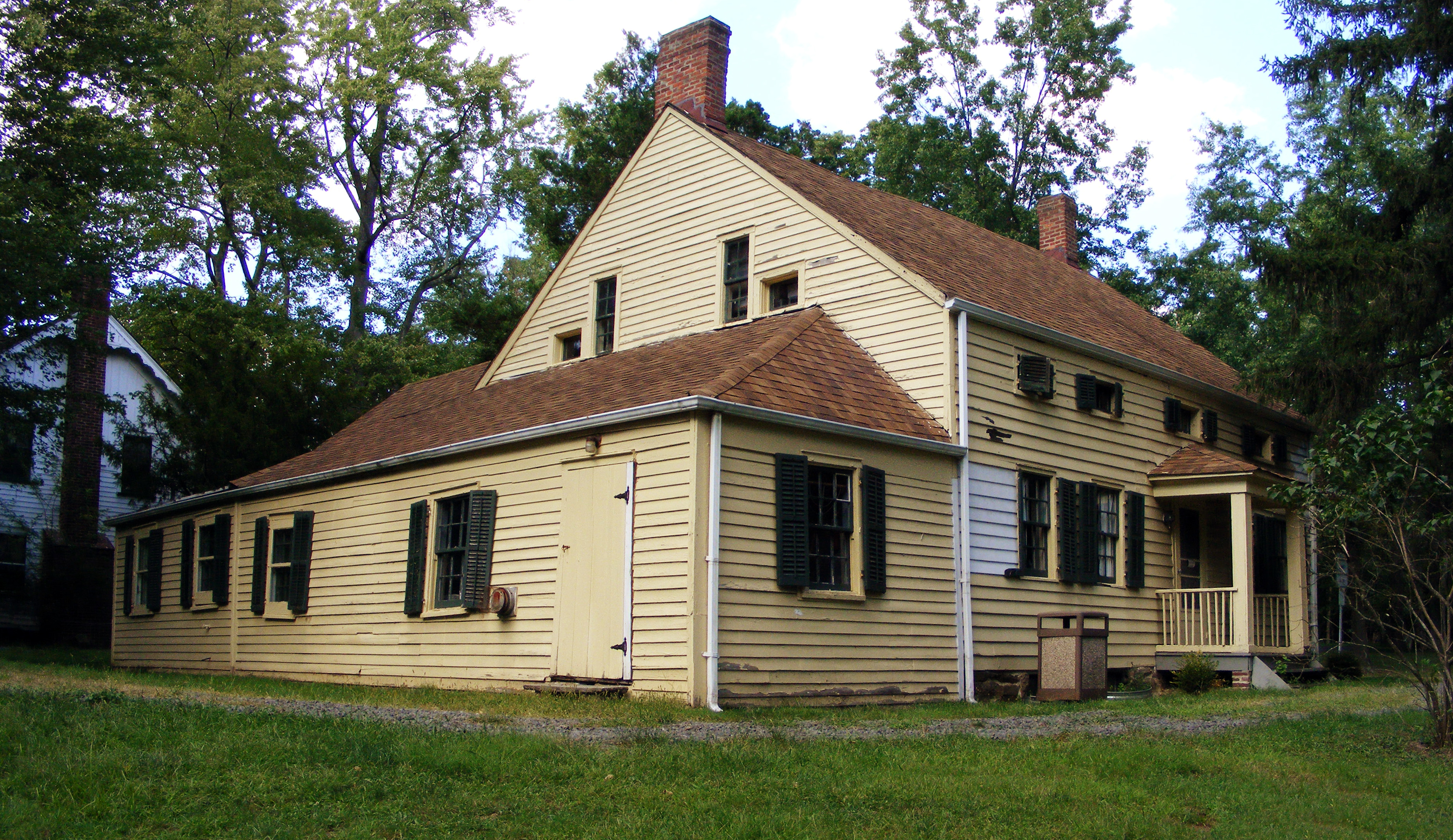

- Location within Union County, New Jersey
- Location: 23 and 31 Horseshoe Road, Berkeley Heights, New Jersey
- Coordinates: 40°40′05″N 74°25′41″W
- Built: 1760
- NRHP reference No.: 79001528
- NJRHP No.: 2649

Significant dates
- Added to NRHP: March 7, 1979
- Designated NJRHP: December 28, 1978

The Littell–Lord Farmstead, located at 23 and 31 Horseshoe Road in the township of Berkeley Heights in Union County, New Jersey, United States, is a pastoral site reminiscent of the county's agricultural past. It was built around 1760 and added to the National Register of Historic Places on March 7, 1979, for its significance in agriculture, architecture, commerce, exploration/settlement, and the performing arts. It currently serves as the home and public museum of the Berkeley Heights Historical Society.

The farmhouse was built around 1760 by farmer and weaver Andrew Littell, who lived there with his wife and seven children. It was passed down through the Littell family until it was sold to the Lord family in 1867. Elizabeth Wemett of the Lord family sold the property to Berkeley Heights in 1975.

The farmstead property, all of which is owned by the township of Berkeley Heights, includes the main farmhouse, an adjacent Victorian annex in the Carpenter Gothic style (which served as a schoolhouse in the 1870s), a stone spring house, a summer kitchen, and 18 acres of farm and forest land.

== See also ==
- National Register of Historic Places listings in Union County, New Jersey
