= Stage House Inn =

- U.S. National Register of Historic Places
- New Jersey Register of Historic Places
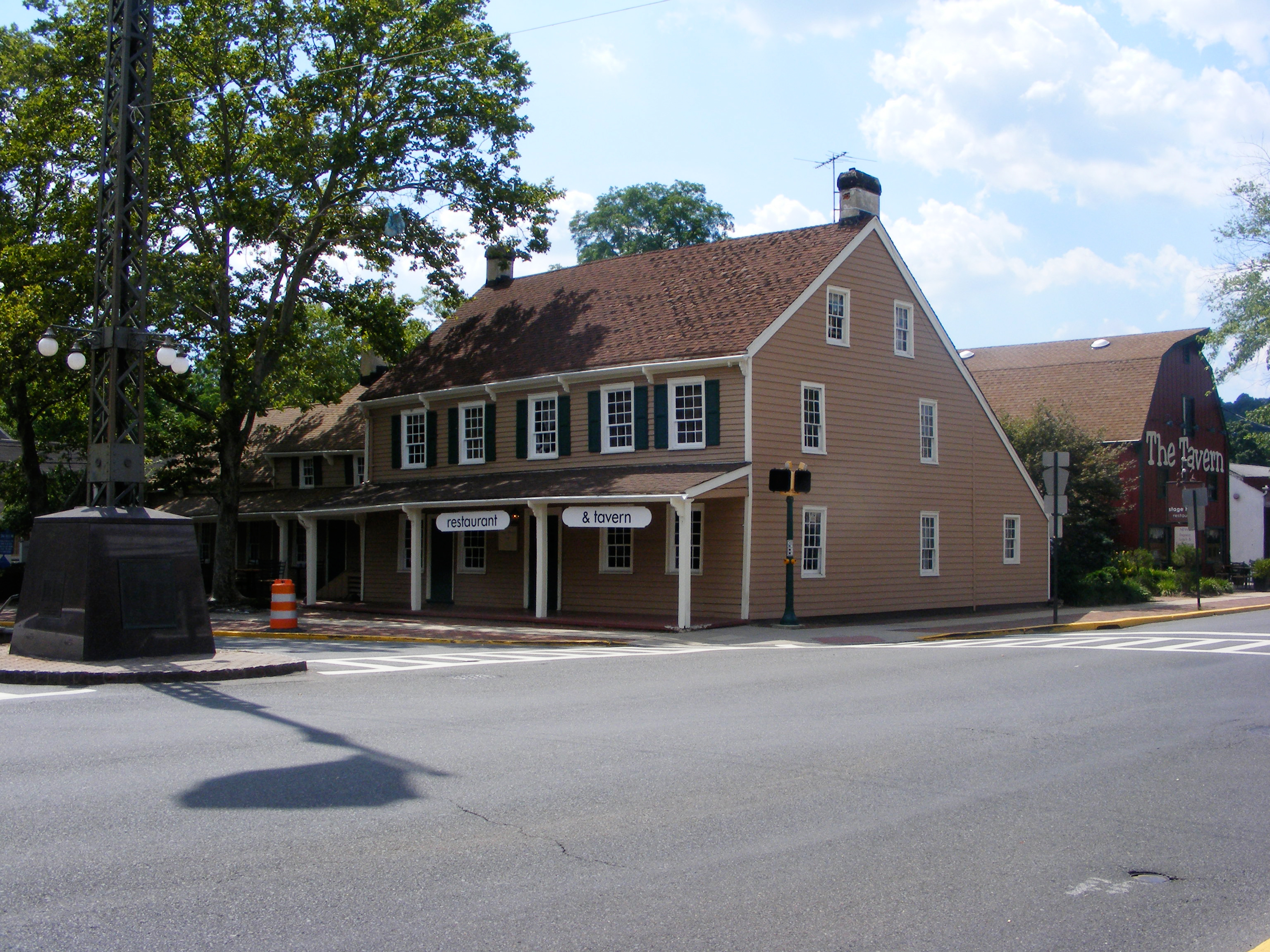

- Location within Union County, New Jersey Location within New Jersey Location within the United States
- Location: Park Avenue and Front Street, Scotch Plains, New Jersey
- Coordinates: 40°39′3″N 74°23′59″W
- Built: 1737
- Built by: John Sutton
- NRHP reference No.: 82003308
- NJRHP No.: 2723

Significant dates
- Added to NRHP: April 15, 1982
- Designated NJRHP: May 11, 1981

The Stage House Inn is located at the intersection of Park Avenue and Front Street in the township of Scotch Plains in Union County, New Jersey, United States. The inn was built in 1737 and was added to the National Register of Historic Places on April 15, 1982, for its significance in architecture, commerce and politics/government.

Through its history, the inn has also been known as Ye Olde Historical Inn, the Stanbury Inn, Ye Olde Tavern, the W.L. Deegans Hotel, Sutton's Tavern, and De Boud's Hotel.

The inn sat prominently on the Old York Road, where it was a regular stop for stagecoaches on the "Swift Sure Stage Line" between New York City and Philadelphia.

It was a primary meeting place for troop messengers and officers during the Revolutionary War; in fact, General Lafayette is known to have stopped at the inn while General George Washington was nearby.

When President Abraham Lincoln called additional troops to defend the Union during the American Civil War, rallies were held in the Stage House Inn.

The building is currently used as a part of the "Stage House Tavern," a restaurant and bar opened in 2003.

== See also ==
- National Register of Historic Places listings in Union County, New Jersey
