= Plainfield Masonic Temple =

- U.S. National Register of Historic Places
- New Jersey Register of Historic Places
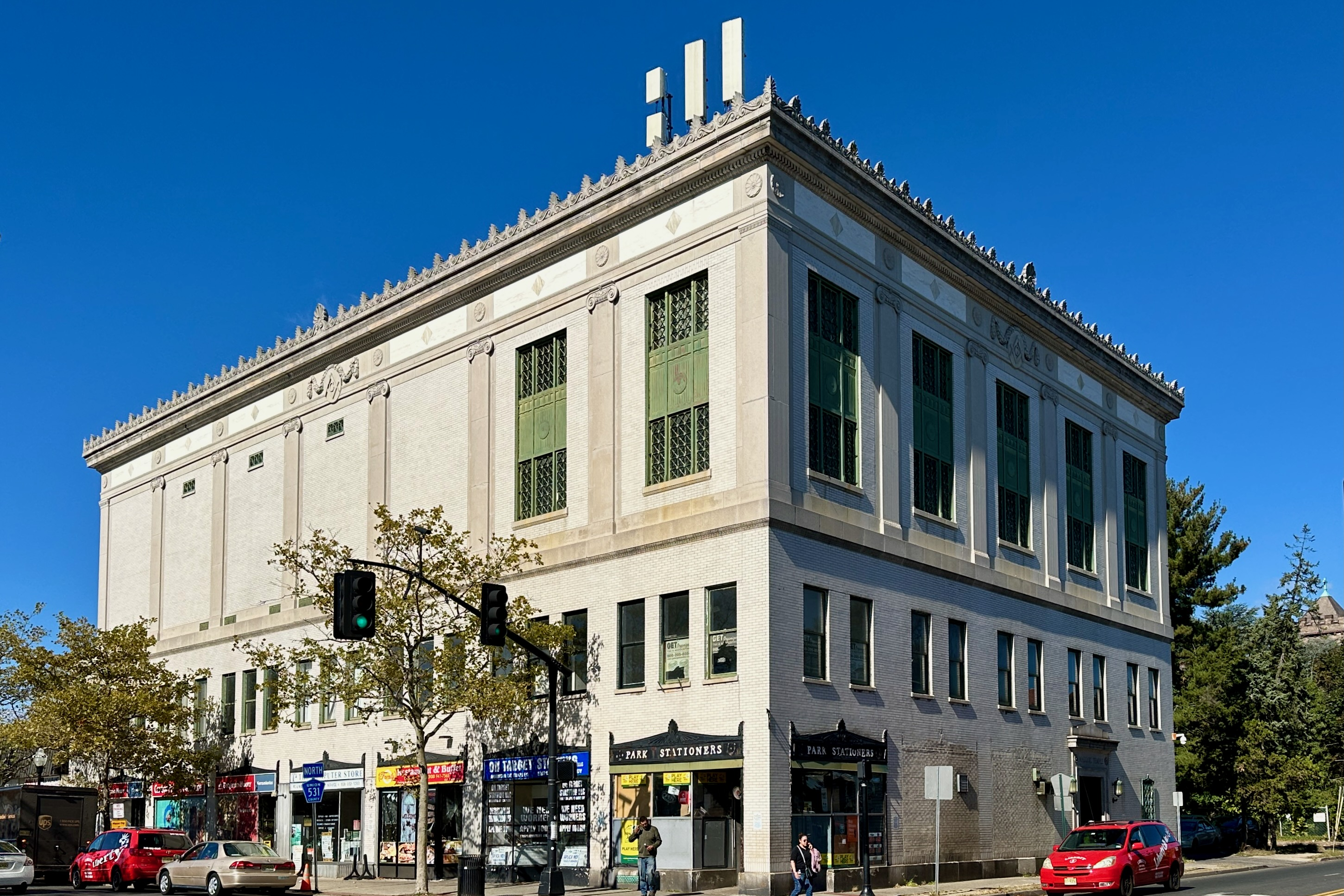
- Plainfield Masonic Temple on 2024

- Location within Union County, New Jersey Location within New Jersey Location within the United States
- Location: 105 East 7th Street, Plainfield, New Jersey
- Coordinates: 40°36′55″N 74°25′2.5″W
- Built: 1929
- Architect: Franklin B. Ware, Arthur Ware
- Architectural style: Neoclassical Revival
- NRHP reference No.: 100010812
- NJRHP No.: 5784

Significant dates
- Added to NRHP: September 16, 2024
- Designated NJRHP: July 31, 2024

The Plainfield Masonic Temple is located at 105 East 7th Street in the city of Plainfield in Union County, New Jersey, United States. Built in 1929 by Jerusalem Lodge No. 26 Free & Accepted Masons, the historic Neoclassical Revival style masonic temple was added to the National Register of Historic Places on September 16, 2024, for its significance in architecture.

== History and description ==
The Neoclassical Revival building was designed by New York City architects Franklin B. Ware and his brother Arthur Ware. The four-story building was constructed by the Wigton–Abbott Corporation and completed in February 1929. The entrance has a granite surround with rosettes and two bronze sconces. On the western side, the building has the Square and Compasses symbol of Freemasonry adorned with a festoon.

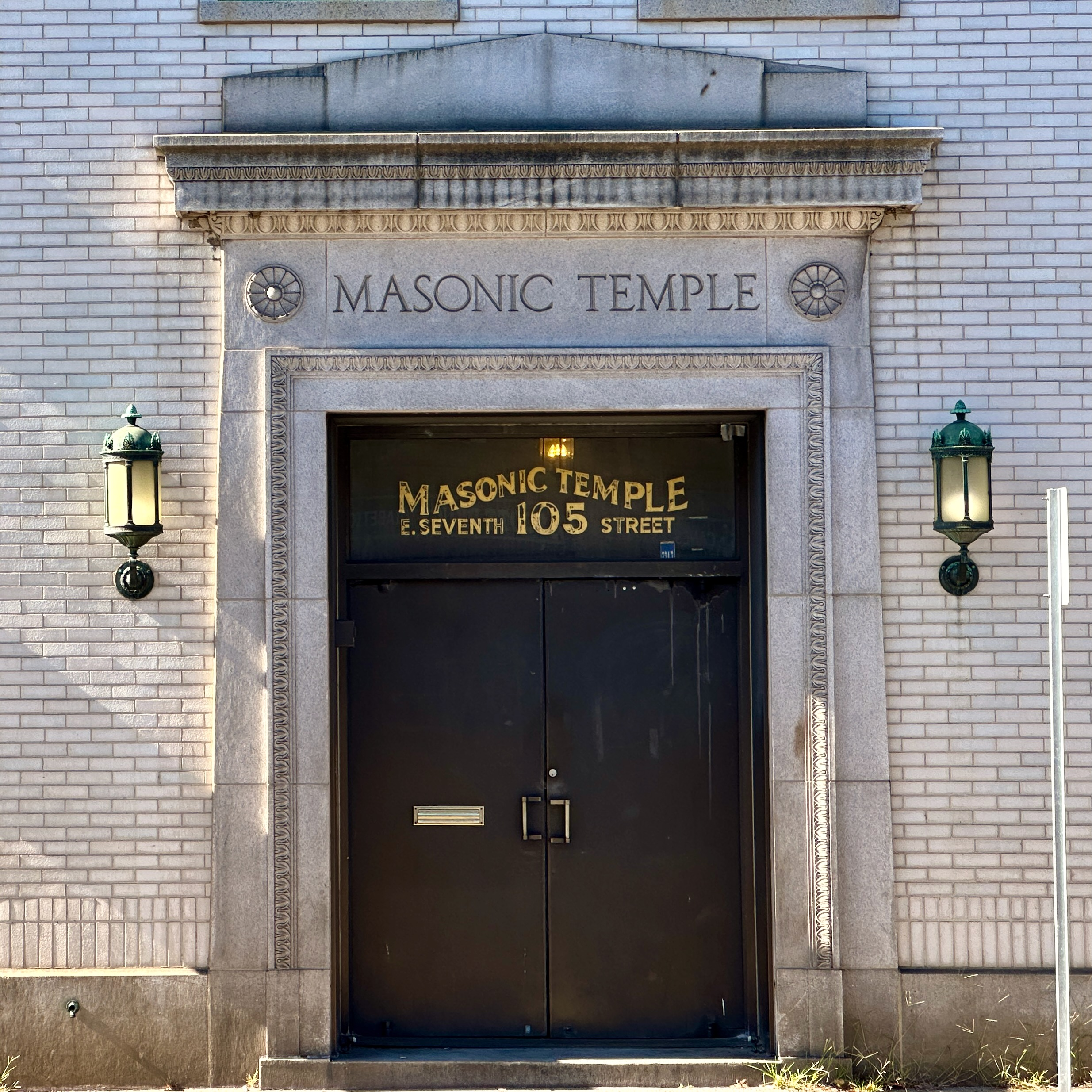
Entrance at 105 East 7th Street

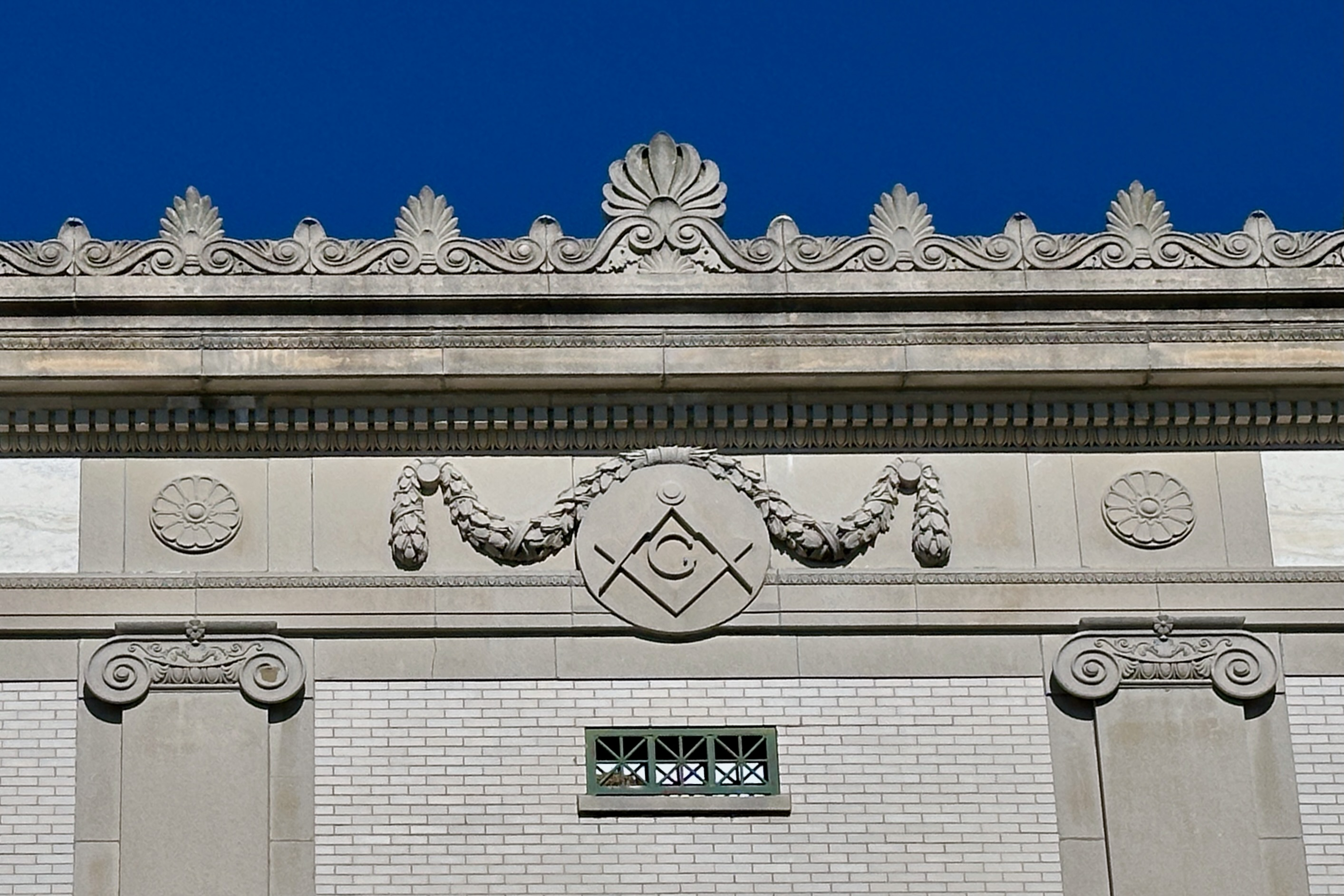
Architectural detail on the western side

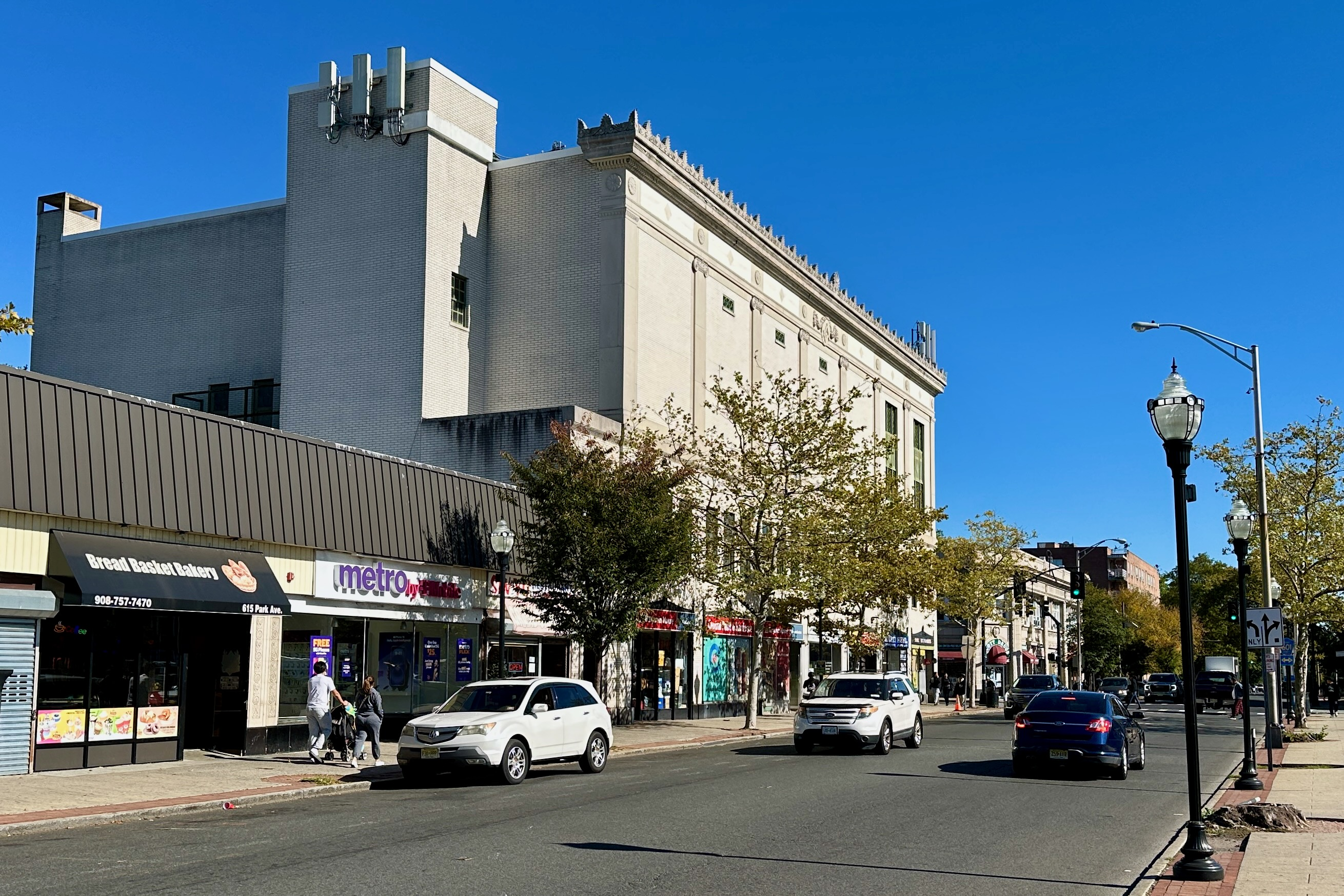
View along Park Avenue

== See also ==
- National Register of Historic Places listings in Union County, New Jersey
- List of Masonic buildings in the United States
