= John De Camp House =

Historic house in New Jersey, United States

- U.S. National Register of Historic Places
- New Jersey Register of Historic Places
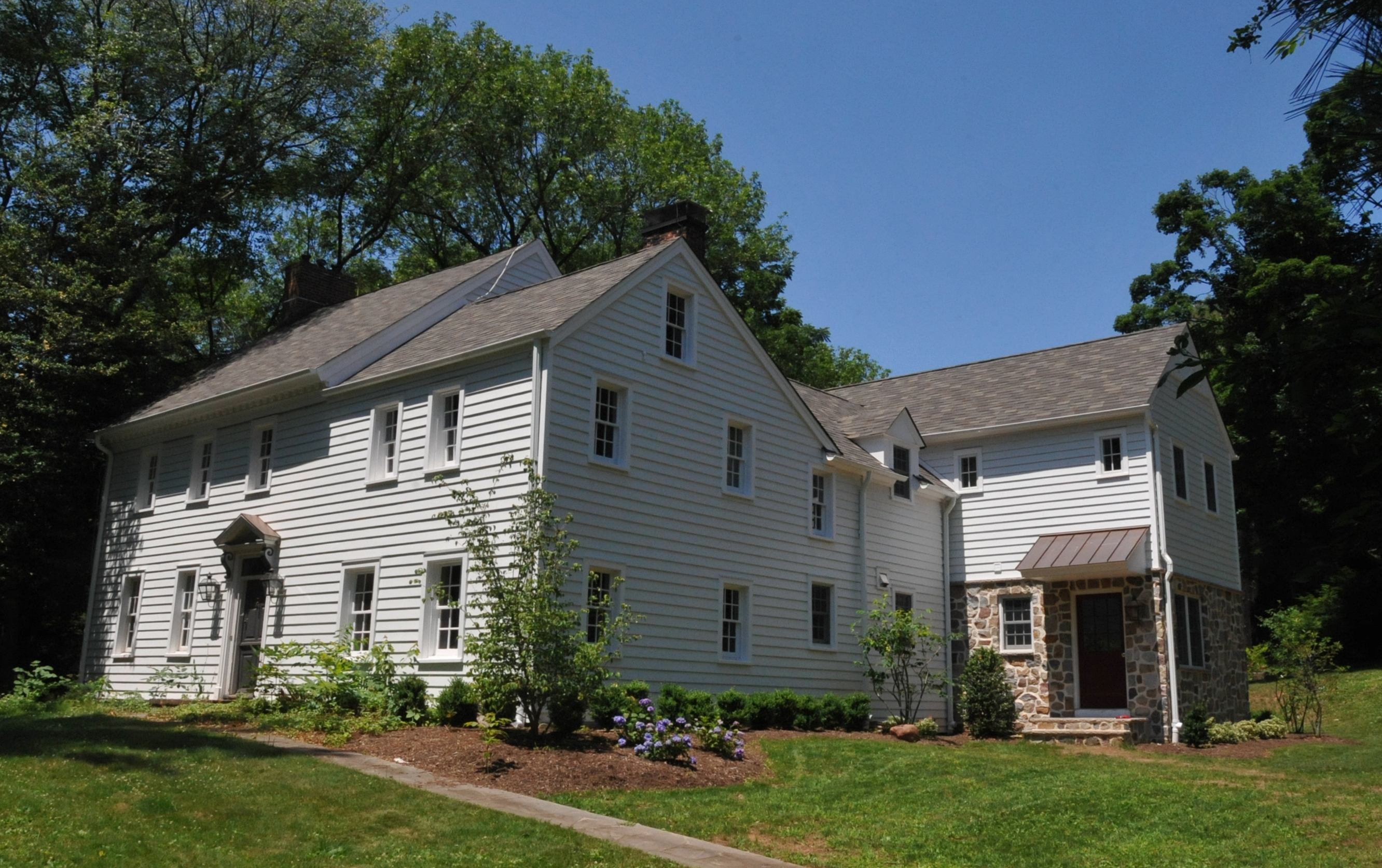

- Location within Union County, New Jersey Location within New Jersey Location within the United States
- Location: 2101 Raritan Road, Scotch Plains, New Jersey
- Coordinates: 40°37′38″N 74°20′27″W
- Area: 3.3 acres (1.3 ha)
- Built: 1739
- Architect: DeCamp, John
- Architectural style: Colonial
- NRHP reference No.: 73001136
- NJRHP No.: 2720

Significant dates
- Added to NRHP: December 4, 1973
- Designated NJRHP: September 14, 1973

The John De Camp House is located in Scotch Plains, New Jersey, United States. The house was built in 1739 and was added to the National Register of Historic Places on December 4, 1973.

== See also ==
- National Register of Historic Places listings in Union County, New Jersey
