= Nathaniel Smith House =

Historic house in New Jersey, United States

- U.S. National Register of Historic Places
- New Jersey Register of Historic Places
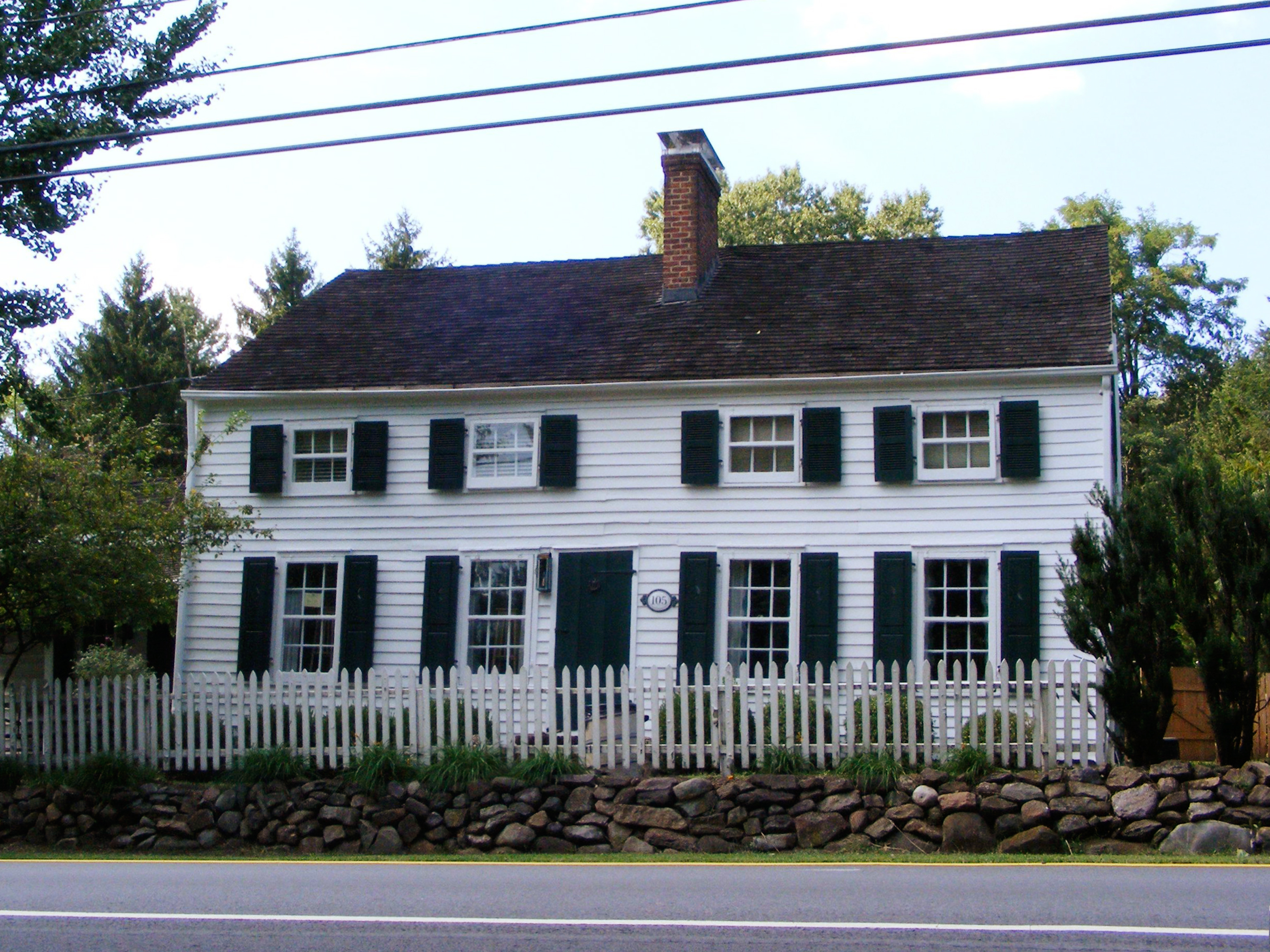

- Location within Union County, New Jersey Location within New Jersey Location within the United States
- Location: 105 Springfield Avenue, Berkeley Heights, New Jersey
- Coordinates: 40.6924°N 74.4285°W
- Built: c.1740
- NRHP reference No.: 89001584
- NJRHP No.: 2650

Significant dates
- Added to NRHP: September 28, 1989
- Designated NJRHP: August 14, 1989

The Nathaniel Smith House is located in Berkeley Heights, Union County, New Jersey, United States. The Colonial home was built c. 1740 and added to the National Register of Historic Places on September 28, 1989.

Frederick and Lois Best owned and restored the house from 1945 to 1995. It remains a private home today.

== See also ==
- National Register of Historic Places listings in Union County, New Jersey
