= Hillside Avenue Historic District (Plainfield, New Jersey) =

- U.S. National Register of Historic Places
- U.S. Historic district
- New Jersey Register of Historic Places
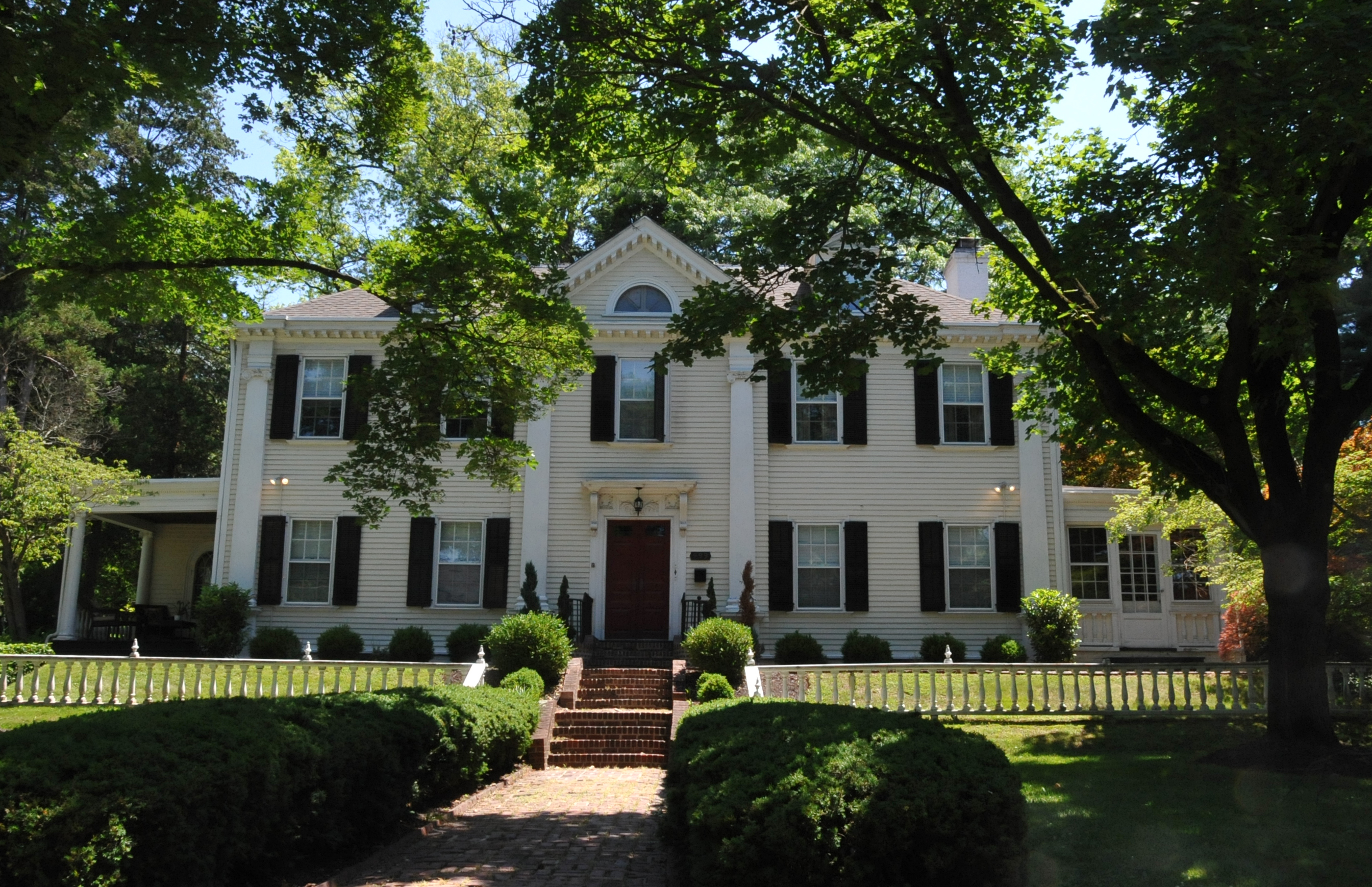
- Colonial Revival house at 999 Hillside Avenue

- Location within Union County, New Jersey Location within New Jersey Location within the United States
- Location: Hillside Avenue from Watchung Avenue to Martine Avenue; Plainfield, New Jersey
- Coordinates: 40°36′55″N 74°24′18″W
- Area: 27 acres (11 ha)
- Architect: Alexander Milne
- Architectural style: Colonial Revival, Queen Anne, Shingle Style
- NRHP reference No.: 82003307
- NJRHP No.: 2699

Significant dates
- Added to NRHP: June 1, 1982
- Designated NJRHP: October 15, 1980

The Hillside Avenue Historic District is a 27-acre (11 ha) historic district located along Hillside Avenue in the city of Plainfield in Union County, New Jersey. It was added to the National Register of Historic Places on June 1, 1982 for its significance in architecture, featuring Colonial Revival architecture. The district includes 33 contributing buildings.

== History and description ==
The houses in this residential district were built in the first quarter of the 20th century. Many feature Colonial Revival architecture. Some houses built earlier have Queen Anne and Second Empire styles. The two and one-half story house at 999 Hillside Avenue was built by architect Alexander Milne in 1907 for William A. Conner. It is a replica of the Longfellow House in Cambridge, Massachusetts.

== See also ==
- National Register of Historic Places listings in Union County, New Jersey
