= Firehouse No. 4 (Plainfield, New Jersey) =

- U.S. National Register of Historic Places
- New Jersey Register of Historic Places
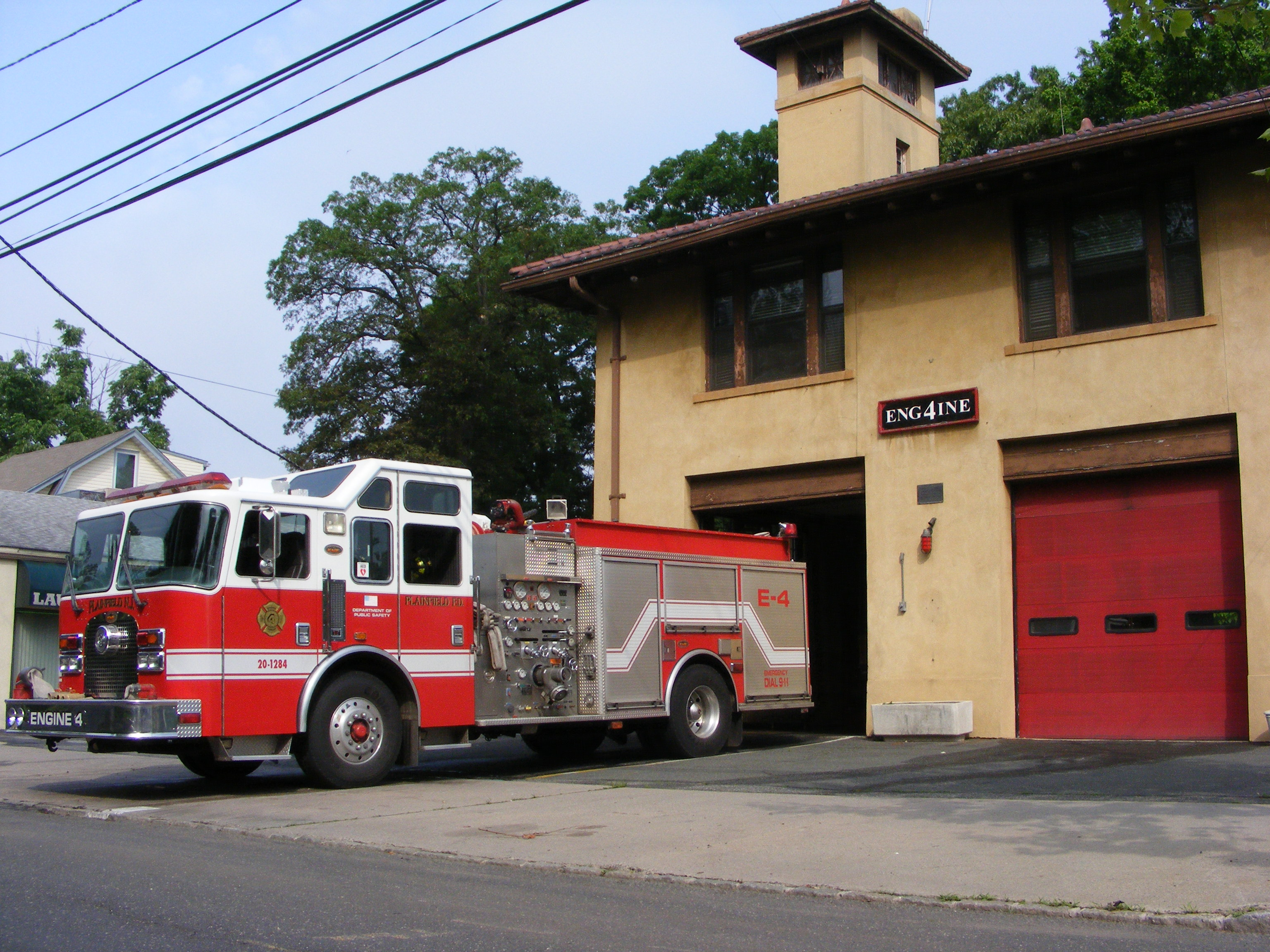

- Location within Union County, New Jersey Location within New Jersey Location within the United States
- Location: 1015 South Avenue, Plainfield, New Jersey
- Coordinates: 40°37′42″N 74°24′14″W
- Area: 0.3 acres (0.12 ha)
- Built: 1888
- Architectural style: Bungalow/Craftsman, Mission/Spanish Revival
- NRHP reference No.: 93000133
- NJRHP No.: 2696

Significant dates
- Added to NRHP: March 11, 1993
- Designated NJRHP: January 25, 1993

Firehouse No. 4 is located in Plainfield, Union County, New Jersey, United States. The firehouse was built in 1910 and added to the National Register of Historic Places on March 11, 1993.

== See also ==
- National Register of Historic Places listings in Union County, New Jersey
