= Oswald J. Nitschke House =

Historic house in New Jersey, United States

- Oswald Nitschke House
- U.S. National Register of Historic Places
- New Jersey Register of Historic Places
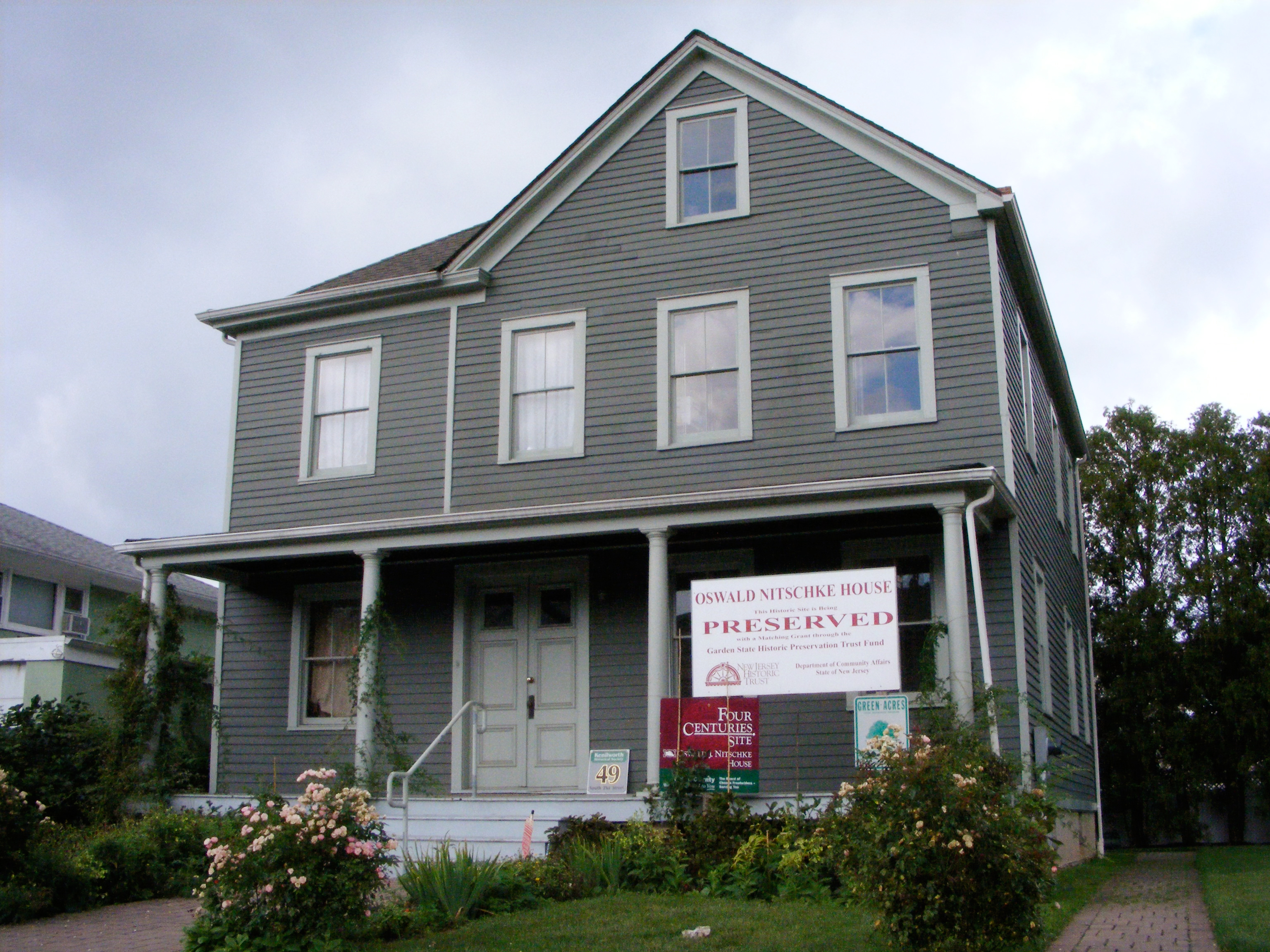

- Location within Union County, New Jersey Location within New Jersey Location within the United States
- Location: 49 South 21st Street, Kenilworth, New Jersey
- Coordinates: 40.67424°N 74.29138°W
- Built: c. 1880
- NRHP reference No.: 07001406
- NJRHP No.: 4296

Significant dates
- Added to NRHP: January 17, 2008
- Designated NJRHP: September 20, 2007

The Oswald Nitschke House is located in Kenilworth, Union County, New Jersey, United States. The clapboard wood frame farmhouse was built c. 1880 and added to the National Register of Historic Places on January 17, 2008.

It is named for Oswald J. Nitschke, a mayor of Kenilworth who served three terms and supported Kenilworth's 1907 incorporation.

In 2003, commercial development threatened to demolish the house, but the Kenilworth Historical Society moved the building 1500 feet to save it.

== See also ==
- National Register of Historic Places listings in Union County, New Jersey
