= Summit Downtown Historic District =

Historic district in New Jersey, United States

- U.S. National Register of Historic Places
- New Jersey Register of Historic Places
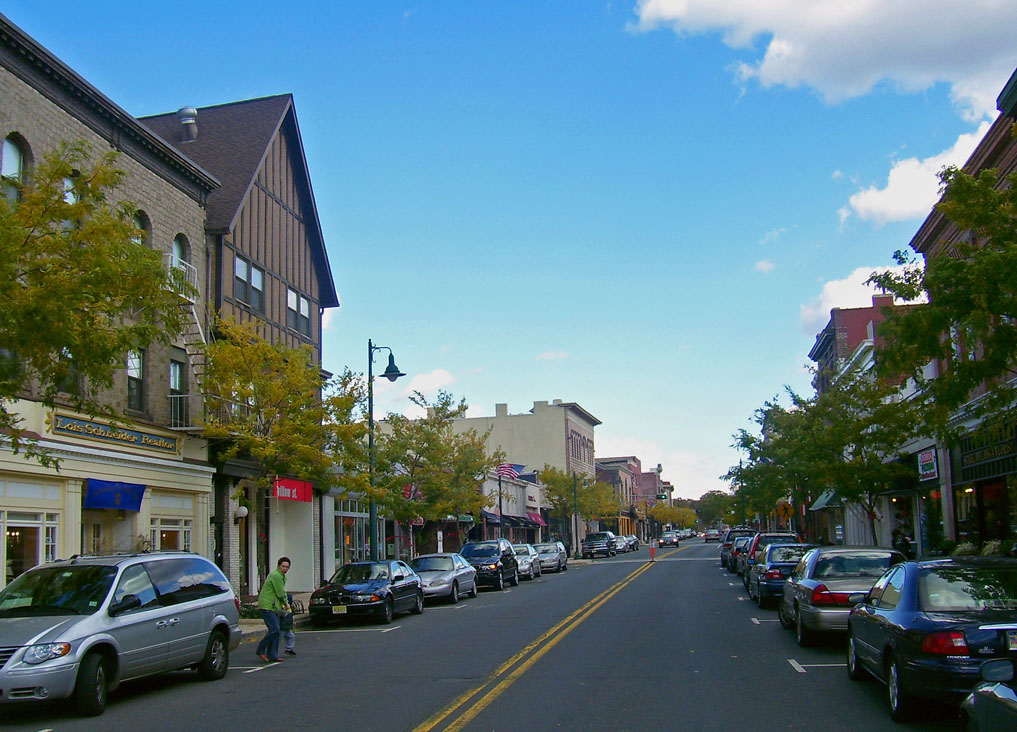

- Location within Union County, New Jersey Location within New Jersey Location within the United States
- Coordinates: 40°42′54″N 74°21′55″W
- NRHP reference No.: 10001116
- NJRHP No.: 3619

Significant dates
- Added to NRHP: June 30, 2011
- Designated NJRHP: November 17, 2010

Summit Downtown Historic District is a historic district in Summit, New Jersey, roughly bounded by Springfield Ave, the Village Green, Summit Ave, and Waldron Ave. The district was listed on the state register on November 17, 2010, and the federal register on June 6, 2011.

== See also ==
- National Register of Historic Places listings in Union County, New Jersey
