= Young Women's Christian Association of Plainfield and North Plainfield =

Historic place in New Jersey, United States

- U.S. National Register of Historic Places
- New Jersey Register of Historic Places
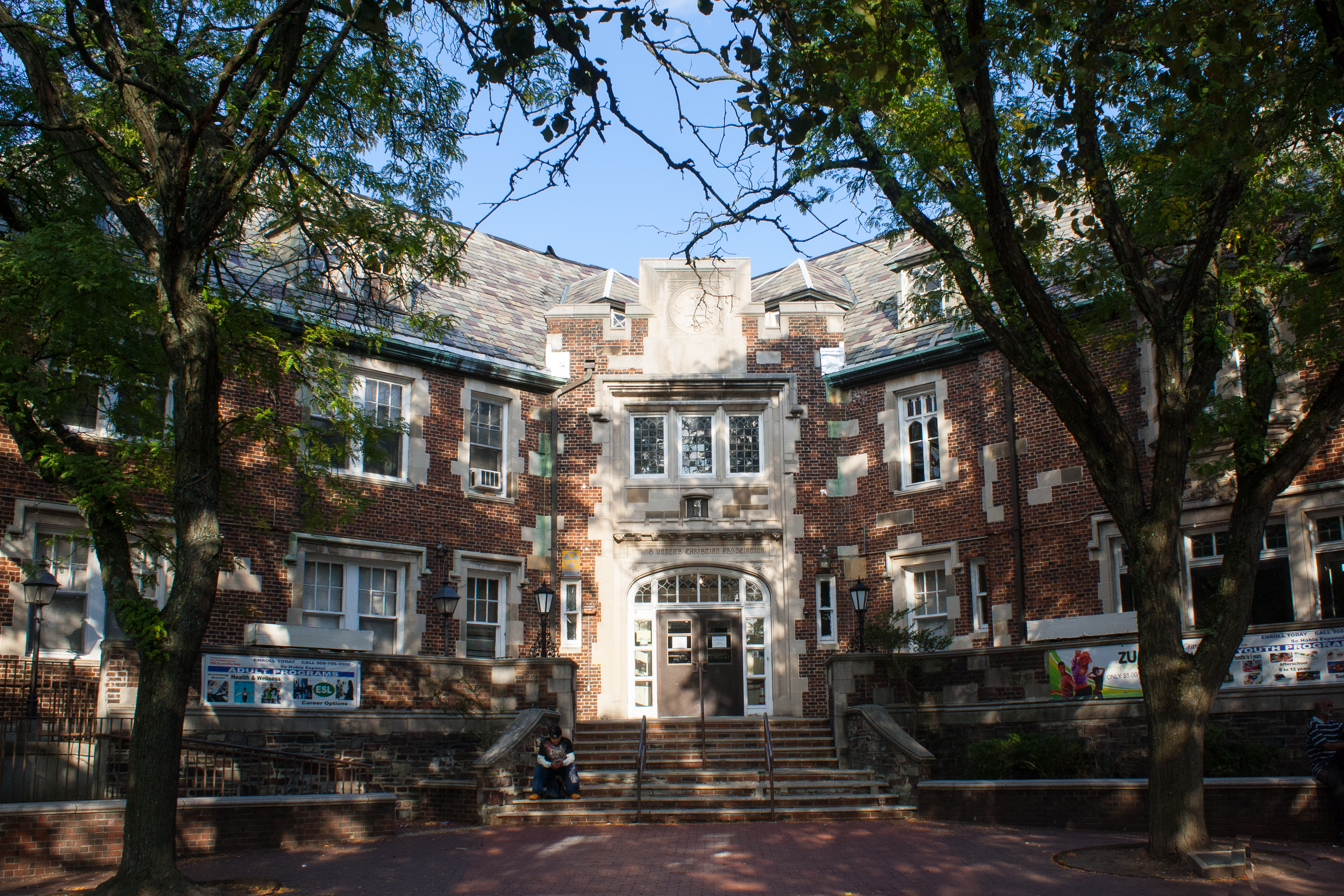
- The YWCA building as seen from the corner of Front and Church Streets in Plainfield, New Jersey.

- Location within Union County, New Jersey Location within New Jersey Location within the United States
- Location: 232 W. Front Street, Plainfield, New Jersey
- Coordinates: 40°37′15″N 74°25′16″W
- Area: less than one acre
- Built: 1924
- Architect: Arthur Ware; Walter Kidde & Co. Inc.
- Architectural style: Tudor Revival
- NRHP reference No.: 98000232
- NJRHP No.: 3484

Significant dates
- Added to NRHP: March 12, 1998
- Designated NJRHP: January 15, 1998

Young Women's Christian Association of Plainfield and North Plainfield is a historic building in Plainfield, Union County, New Jersey, United States.

It was built in 1924 and as the name suggests intended to serve young women of both Plainfield and North Plainfield. The building was added to the National Register of Historic Places in 1998.

== See also ==
- National Register of Historic Places listings in Union County, New Jersey
