= James Townley House =

Historic house in New Jersey, United States

- U.S. National Register of Historic Places
- New Jersey Register of Historic Places
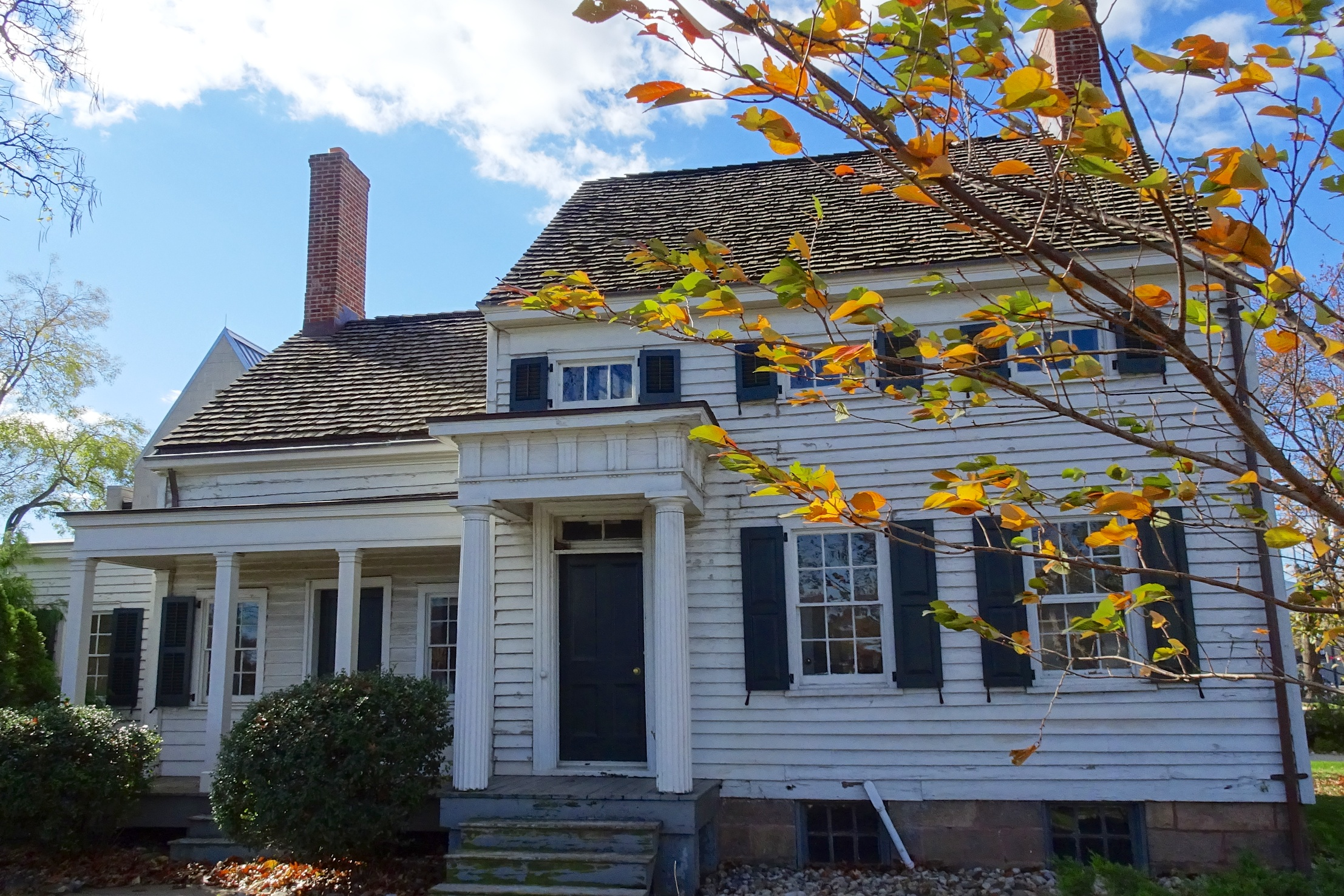

- Location within Union County, New Jersey Location within New Jersey Location within the United States
- Location: Kean University Campus, Morris Avenue and Green Lane, Union Township, Union County, New Jersey
- Coordinates: 40°40′54″N 74°14′05″W
- Built: c. 1796
- Built by: John Townley
- NRHP reference No.: 79001530
- NJRHP No.: 2734

Significant dates
- Added to NRHP: May 14, 1979
- Designated NJRHP: February 16, 1979

The James Townley House is a historic farmhouse on the campus of Kean University located at the intersection of Morris Avenue and Green Lane in Union Township, Union County, New Jersey. It was documented by the Historic American Buildings Survey (HABS) in 1939. The house was added to the National Register of Historic Places on May 14, 1979, for its significance in architecture.

== History and description ==
The oldest part of the farmhouse was built before 1796 by William Townley. His son James Townley (1760–1823) expanded it twice by 1820. The property remained in the Townley family until 1848 when Noah Parcell acquired it and added Greek Revival features. Hamilton F. Kean became the owner of the house in 1917. He was a U.S. Senator for New Jersey from 1929 to 1935. The state bought the property in 1954 and used it to move Newark State College (now Kean University) here.

== See also ==
- National Register of Historic Places listings in Union County, New Jersey
