= Twin Maples =

Historic house in New Jersey, United States

- U.S. National Register of Historic Places
- New Jersey Register of Historic Places
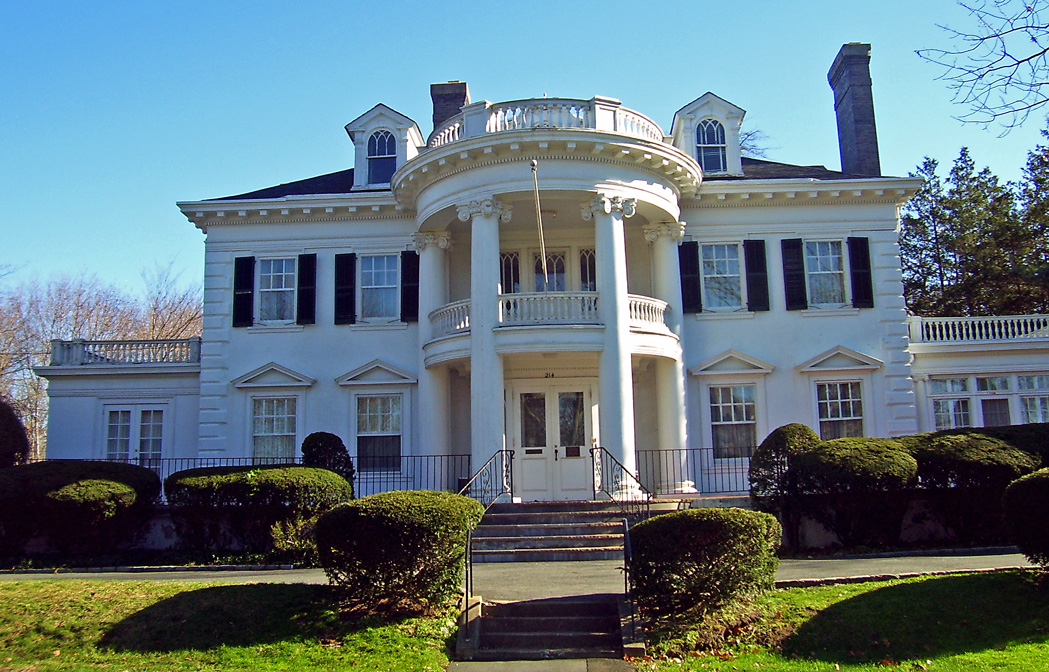
- Twin Maples in 2006

- Location within Union County, New Jersey Location within New Jersey Location within the United States
- Location: 8 Edgewood Road, Summit, New Jersey
- Coordinates: 40°43′02″N 74°21′00″W
- Built: 1908
- Architectural style: Classical Revival
- NRHP reference No.: 97000977
- NJRHP No.: 3491

Significant dates
- Added to NRHP: August 29, 1997
- Designated NJRHP: July 16, 1997

Twin Maples is an estate located at 8 Edgewood Road in the city of Summit in Union County, New Jersey, United States. It was listed on the National Register of Historic Places on August 29, 1997, for its significance in architecture. Twin Maples was built in 1908, designed by a well-known New York and Montclair architect, Alfred F. Norris, who designed the home in the neoclassical style with a facade dominated by a full-height porch, supported by classical columns.

Twin Maples was purchased by the Fortnightly Club in 1949 and remains the home of the Fortnightly Club (established 1893), as well as the Summit Junior Fortnightly Club, both 501(c)3 charitable organizations. In 2007, the two clubs joined to renovate historic Twin Maples and opened her doors to area charities for their fundraising events and meetings at suitably low rates.

== See also ==
- National Register of Historic Places listings in Union County, New Jersey
