= St. John's Episcopal Church (Elizabeth, New Jersey) =

Historic church

Coordinates: 40.664116°N 74.214317°W

- U.S. Historic district – Contributing property
- New Jersey Register of Historic Places
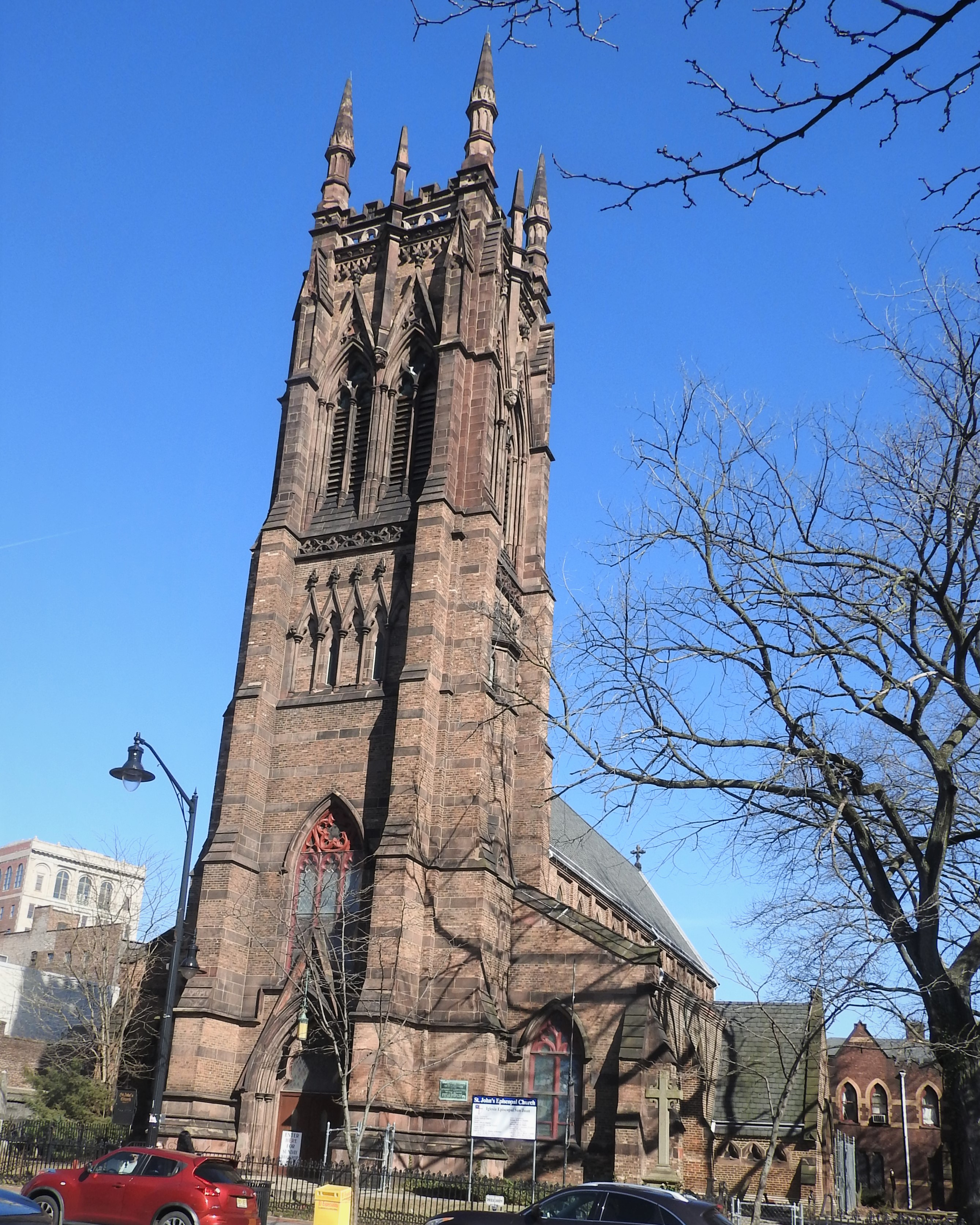

- Location within Union County, New Jersey
- Part of: Mid-Town Historic District (ID95001143)
- NJRHP No.: 2665

Significant dates
- Designated CP: October 5, 1995
- Designated NJRHP: September 29, 1994

St. John's Episcopal Church (official name, St. John's Church) is a historic Episcopal church located at 61 Broad Street in the historic heart of Elizabeth, New Jersey. Now part of the Episcopal Diocese of New Jersey headquartered in Trenton, it was founded in 1706 by missionaries of the Society for the Propagation of the Gospel, London, England. The current building, consecrated in 1860, is in the neo-Gothic style, with a 126-foot Gothic style tower (completed in 1864).

== History ==
For almost four decades in the 18th century, Rev. Thomas Bradbury Chandler led this congregation and helped found what became the Episcopal Church in the United States. Massachusetts-born and a 1745 graduate of Yale College, Chandler became the lay reader and catechist for this parish in 1747, then sailed to England to complete his studies and was ordained by the Bishop of London in 1751, who formally installed him as this parish's rector despite remaining overseas. For much of his career, Chandler worked to establish the Church of England in the mid-Atlantic colonies, including publishing several works advocating a bishop based in North America, despite the opposition of the Presbyterian and Congregational churches. Following his Tory sympathies and fearing threats from the Sons of Liberty, Chandler fled to England in 1775, where he remained during the American Revolutionary War, only to accept the congregation's invitation and return to Elizabethtown and resume his duties during the last five years of his life. He cited health reasons for refusing to become the first Church of England bishop in North America, and died about a year after the 1789 founding of the Episcopal Church as an entity distinct from the Church of England. The Episcopal Church recognizes Rev. Chandler liturgically on August 17 (together with his mentor Rev. Samuel Johnson and fellow colonial-era priest Rev. Timothy Cutler), his son-in-law Bishop John Henry Hobart on September 17, and his grandson Bishop William Hobart Hare on May 17.

Although this parish would gain a reputation for ecumenical tolerance, Rev. Chandler forbad famed revival preacher George Whitefield from preaching in his pulpit during the winter of 1763–64 but did marry the parents of Elizabeth Ann Seton, who would become the first American-born Roman Catholic saint. Nonetheless, for nearly 150 years both Anglicans/Episcopalians and Roman Catholics worshiped together at St. John's until the first Roman Catholic Church was established in Elizabeth in 1855, St. Mary of the Assumption Roman Catholic Church. However, the monthly Eucharist/Mass was always presided over by an Anglican/Episcopal vicar or rector or priest.

== 1860 church building ==
The current church building, consecrated in 1860, was designed after St. Mary's University Anglican Church (interior) in Oxford, England, and Merton College, Oxford (exterior). It seats approximately 700 and is the largest Episcopal worship site in New Jersey. It once had five of the largest Tiffany stained glass windows in the U.S. Underneath is the unmarked burial site of the youngest signer of the U.S. Constitution, U.S. Senator Jonathan Dayton.

== Current status ==
St. John's has always been an ecumenical church and remains so today, but its governing body, the Vestry, is and was always composed of confirmed Episcopalians/Anglicans. Its principal Sunday worship service now is the Holy Eucharist/Mass. The church founded the Habitat for Humanity affiliate for eastern Union County in 1993 which was active until 2020. It is known as a lively sponsor of community social services and feeds as many as 150 persons a free meal each Sunday following the 11:00 Spanish worship service which is a Spanish Eucharist with contemporary Spanish music, followed by a community fiesta at 12:15 Visitors are always welcome! The Rector Emeritus is the Rev. Joseph R. Parrish Jr., who served there from July 1989 until his retirement in July 2013; the Rev. Jorge Martinez serves as Priest-in-Charge. For 14 years, from September 2000 until 2014, the church telecast its church services each Sunday at 9:00 am on Elizabeth Cablevision Channel 18. The church's Sunday service is now broadcast on its Facebook page.

== Churchyard and notable interments ==
St. John's Episcopal Churchyard is a cemetery on the grounds of St. John's Episcopal Church. Notable interments in the church itself or the surrounding churchyard include:

- US Senator Jonathan Dayton (1760–1824), youngest person to sign the United States Constitution.
- John De Hart (1727–1795), Associate Justice of the New Jersey Supreme Court from 1776 to 1777.
- Isaac W. Scudder (1816–1881), represented New Jersey's 7th congressional district from 1873 to 1875.
