= George A. Strong House =

- U.S. National Register of Historic Places
- New Jersey Register of Historic Places
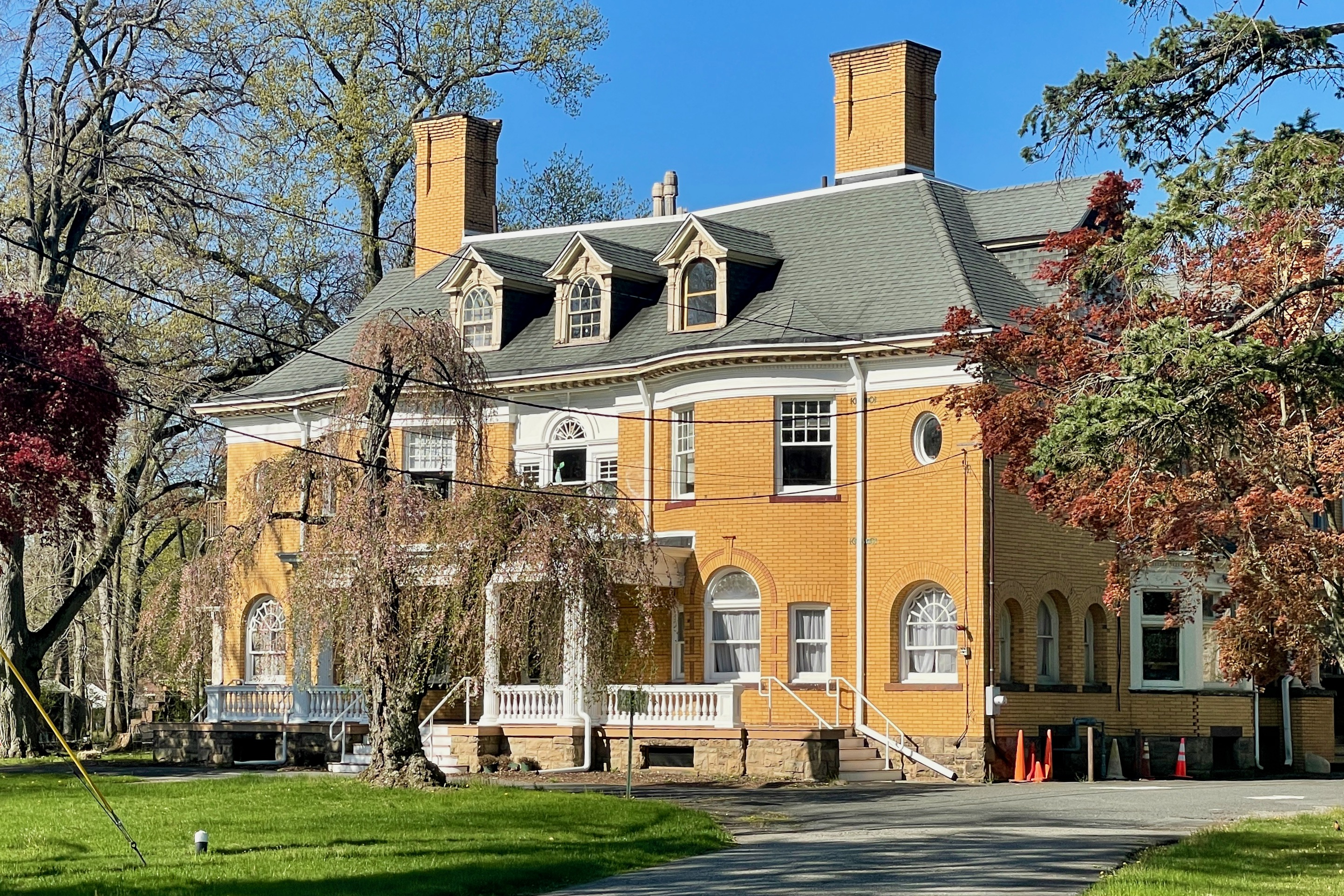
- duCret School of Art

- Location within Union County, New Jersey Location within New Jersey Location within the United States
- Location: 1030 Central Avenue; Plainfield, New Jersey
- Coordinates: 40°36′18″N 74°25′1″W
- Area: 5 acres (2.0 ha)
- Built: 1896
- Built by: John Abbott
- Architect: Rossiter & Wright
- Architectural style: Colonial Revival, International Style
- NRHP reference No.: 12000570
- NJRHP No.: 4734

Significant dates
- Added to NRHP: August 28, 2012
- Designated NJRHP: June 29, 2012

The George A. Strong House is a historic building located at 1030 Central Avenue in the city of Plainfield in Union County, New Jersey. Built in 1896, it was added to the National Register of Historic Places on August 28, 2012, for its significance in architecture, education, and community planning and development. The duCret School of Art purchased the building in 1977 to use for art education.

== History and description ==
The original two and one-half story brick building featuring Colonial Revival architecture was constructed in 1896 for George A. Strong, a lawyer, and his family. A gymnasium was added in 1933 for use by the Wardlaw School, which had purchased the building that year. A library was added in 1947. Two additions featuring International Style were built in the 1960s. It was purchased by the duCret School of Art in 1977.

== See also ==
- National Register of Historic Places listings in Union County, New Jersey
