= Grace Episcopal Church (Plainfield, New Jersey) =

Historic church in New Jersey, United States

- Grace Church or Grace Episcopal Church
- U.S. National Register of Historic Places
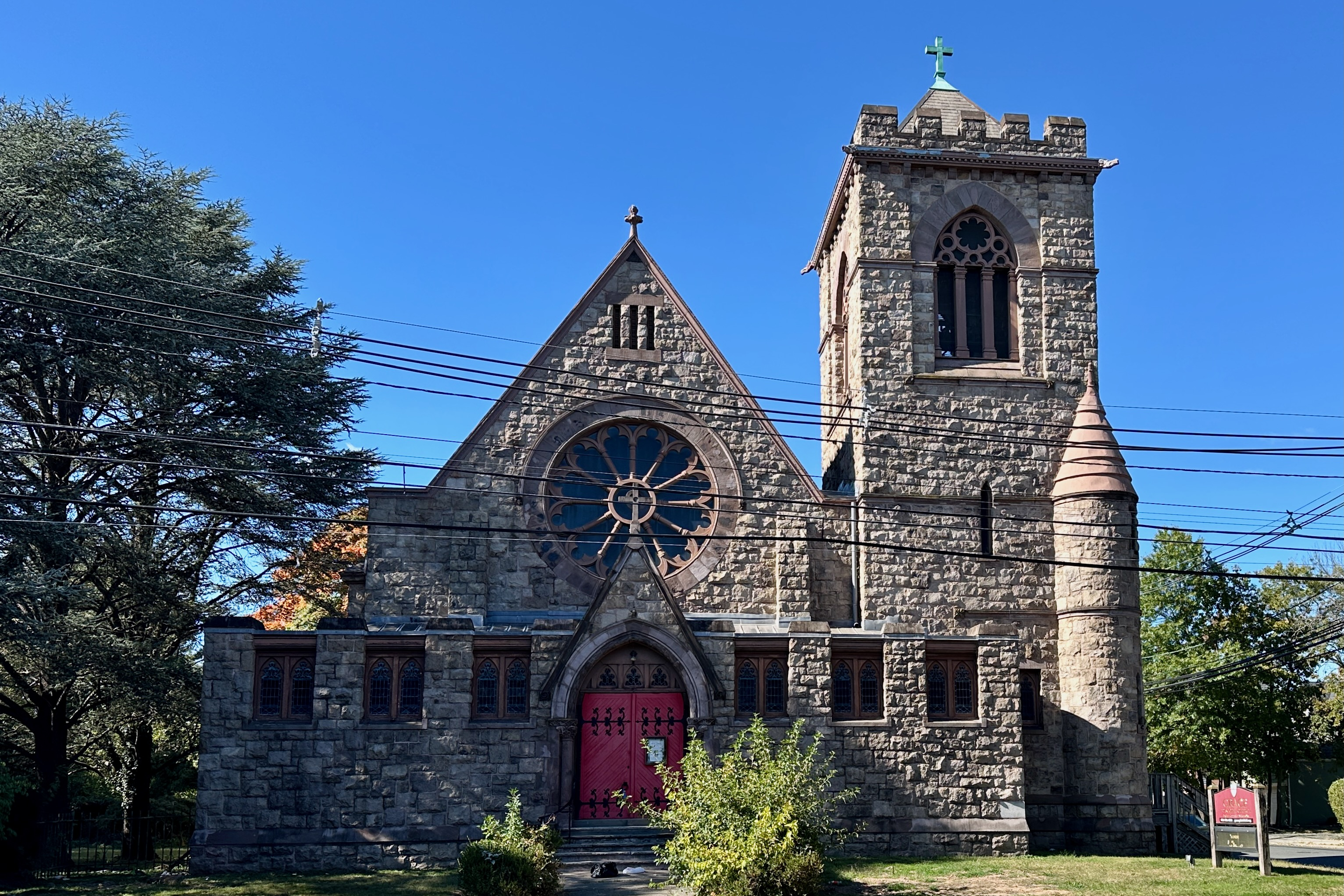
- Seventh Street entrance

- Location within Union County, New Jersey Location within New Jersey Location within the United States
- Location: 600 Cleveland Avenue; Plainfield, New Jersey
- Coordinates: 40°37′5″N 74°25′2″W
- Area: 1.7 acres (0.69 ha)
- Built: 1892
- Architect: Robert W. Gibson; Charles Wilson; et al.
- Architectural style: Gothic Revival
- NRHP reference No.: 02000106
- Added to NRHP: May 10, 2002

Grace Church or Grace Episcopal Church is a historic Episcopal church located at 600 Cleveland Avenue in Plainfield, Union County, New Jersey, United States. It was added to the National Register of Historic Places on May 10, 2002, for its significance in architecture, art, and music from 1892 to 1930. It is a parish of the Episcopal Diocese of New Jersey. The church reported 112 members in 2015 and 21 members in 2023; no membership statistics were reported in 2024 parochial reports. Plate and pledge income reported for the congregation in 2024 was $20,055 with average Sunday attendance (ASA) of two persons.

== History ==
On April 18, 1853, St. Mary's Episcopal Church was established. Three months later, the cornerstone of the church edifice was laid at East Front Street between Richmond and Berckman Streets in Plainfield—land the church had received as a gift—and construction was completed by early autumn. Over the next decade the congregation outgrew the church building and purchased the current site in the then-posh uptown neighborhood of Seventh Street and Sycamore Street (now Cleveland Avenue) and the original building was relocated. The removal and reconstruction of the old edifice was completed during the summer of 1876, and the congregation worshiped in the new building for the first time on October 15, 1876.

As Plainfield grew, it became a populous commuter town, the decision to build a larger church suitable for the needs of the church and its community was made. They turned to the renowned architect Robert W. Gibson, who was also responsible for several historic landmark New York City buildings, to design Grace Church as a stone Gothic-Revival structure with carved red sandstone trim and hints of the Romanesque.

== Architecture ==
On May 5, 1891, the cornerstone of the new church was laid, and the first service in the new edifice was on April 17, 1892. In design and workmanship, Grace Church reflects late 19th century ecclesiastical architecture. The building is a two-story cruciform plan Gothic Revival style, characterized by the use of asymmetry, cruciform plan, pointed arched windows and arches, gothic style door carvings, and decorative sandstone trim around door and window openings. The church has a central nave flanked by narrow side aisles. Clerestory windows above the aisles illuminate the interior.

The chapel in the south transept of the nave is a memorial to Walter C. Scott and dedicated in 1966 designated as the Chapel of Christ the King. The pulpit of white oak was dedicated on All Saints Day, 1964, in memory of Dorothy Fleming Waring. In niches between the several carved linen fold panels are the Four Evangelists, Matthew, Mark, Luke and John, which were carved in Italy. At the foot of each figure is a carved symbol of the four Gospels.

The Parish House, constructed in 1905, has six classrooms, and two offices on the second level. The lower level consists of five classrooms, a small gymnasium, offices where Plainfield Community Outreach is located, the Choirmaster's Office, and the Choir room. The main floor houses the All Saints Chapel, Vestry Meeting Room, and parlor which connects the kitchen. At the end of the hallway, there is a large assembly hall named after Dr. Harry James Knickle, the ninth rector. On the opposite end of the main floor leading into the church is the Church office, and Rectors Office.

== Ackerman Memorial Garden ==
The Ackerman Memorial Garden was dedicated on Sunday, May 18, 1969. The garden was given by the Ackerman sons in memory of their father and mother, were lifelong, devoted and faithful members of Grace Church. The Building & Maintenance Commission oversees the planting and grounds keeping. Today, with the plantings of flowers that attract various butterflies, the garden has been called "the Butterfly Garden". Parishioners may choose to have their cremains buried in the garden.

== See also ==
- National Register of Historic Places listings in Union County, New Jersey
