= Deacon Andrew Hetfield House =

Historic house in New Jersey, United States

- U.S. National Register of Historic Places
- New Jersey Register of Historic Places
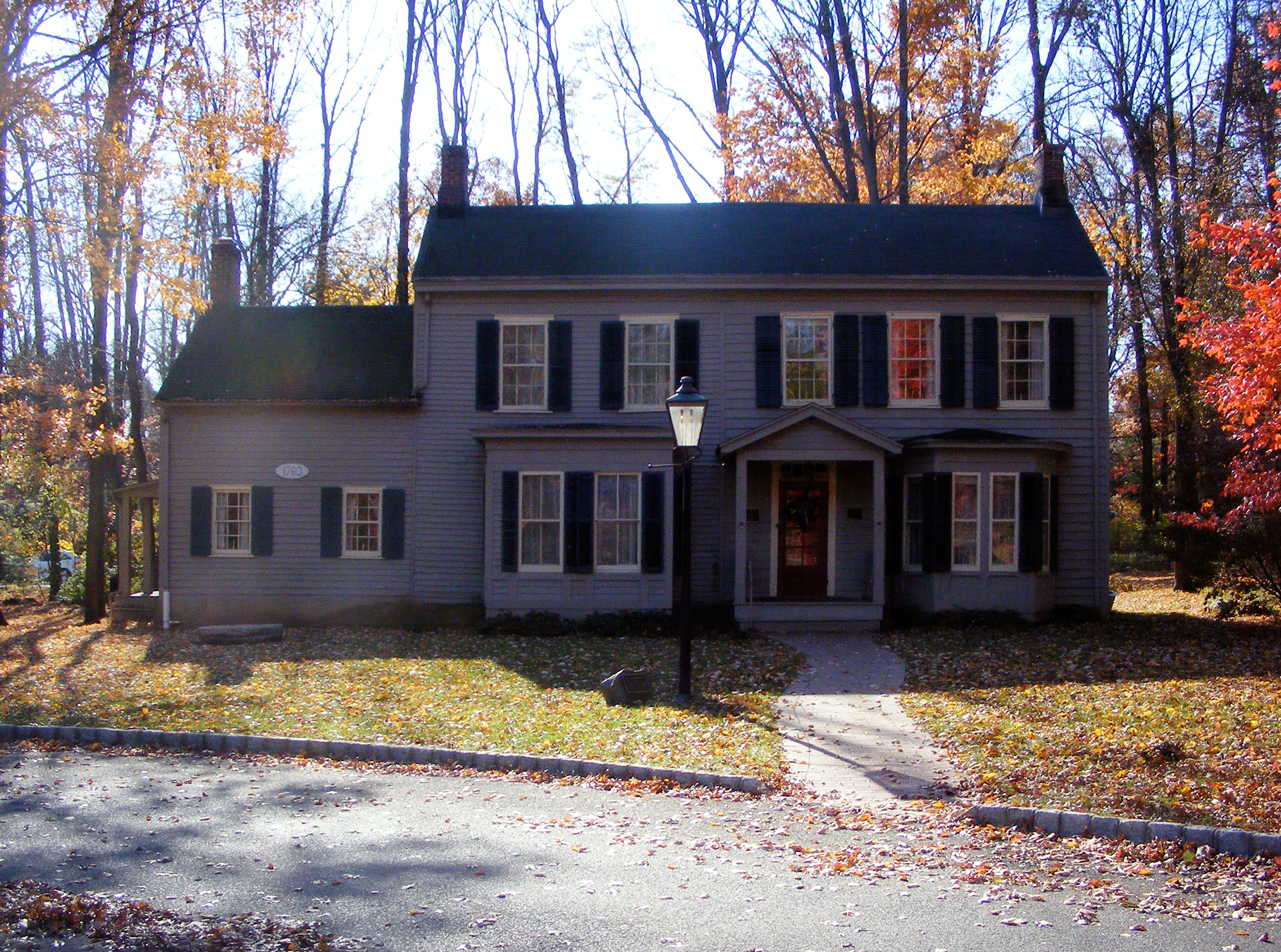

- Location within Union County, New Jersey Location within New Jersey Location within the United States
- Location: Constitution Plaza, Mountainside, New Jersey
- Coordinates: 40°40′19″N 74°21′29″W
- NRHP reference No.: 89001004
- NJRHP No.: 4433

Significant dates
- Added to NRHP: July 27, 1989
- Designated NJRHP: June 8, 1989

Deacon Andrew Hetfield House, also known as the Hetfield House or the Dutch Oven House, is a historical house in Mountainside, Union County, New Jersey, United States. It was built around 1763 by Deacon Andrew Hetfield, who was a Presbyterian deacon in Westfield. The Hetfield House was nicknamed "the Dutch Oven House" during its stint as an antique store during the 1930s-1980s.

The house has been moved twice: once to shift it 50 feet back when they were widening the nearby highway, and a second relocation in 1985 to save it from bulldozing. Reportedly, the house suffered minimal structural damage from the second move (one windowpane was lost).

The Hetfield House has been expanded over the years; as of 1830, the simple colonial farmhouse had been transformed “into a center-hall Georgian residence” (New Jersey Historical Commission, p. 24).
