= Boxwood Hall =

Historic house in New Jersey, United States

- U.S. National Register of Historic Places
- U.S. National Historic Landmark
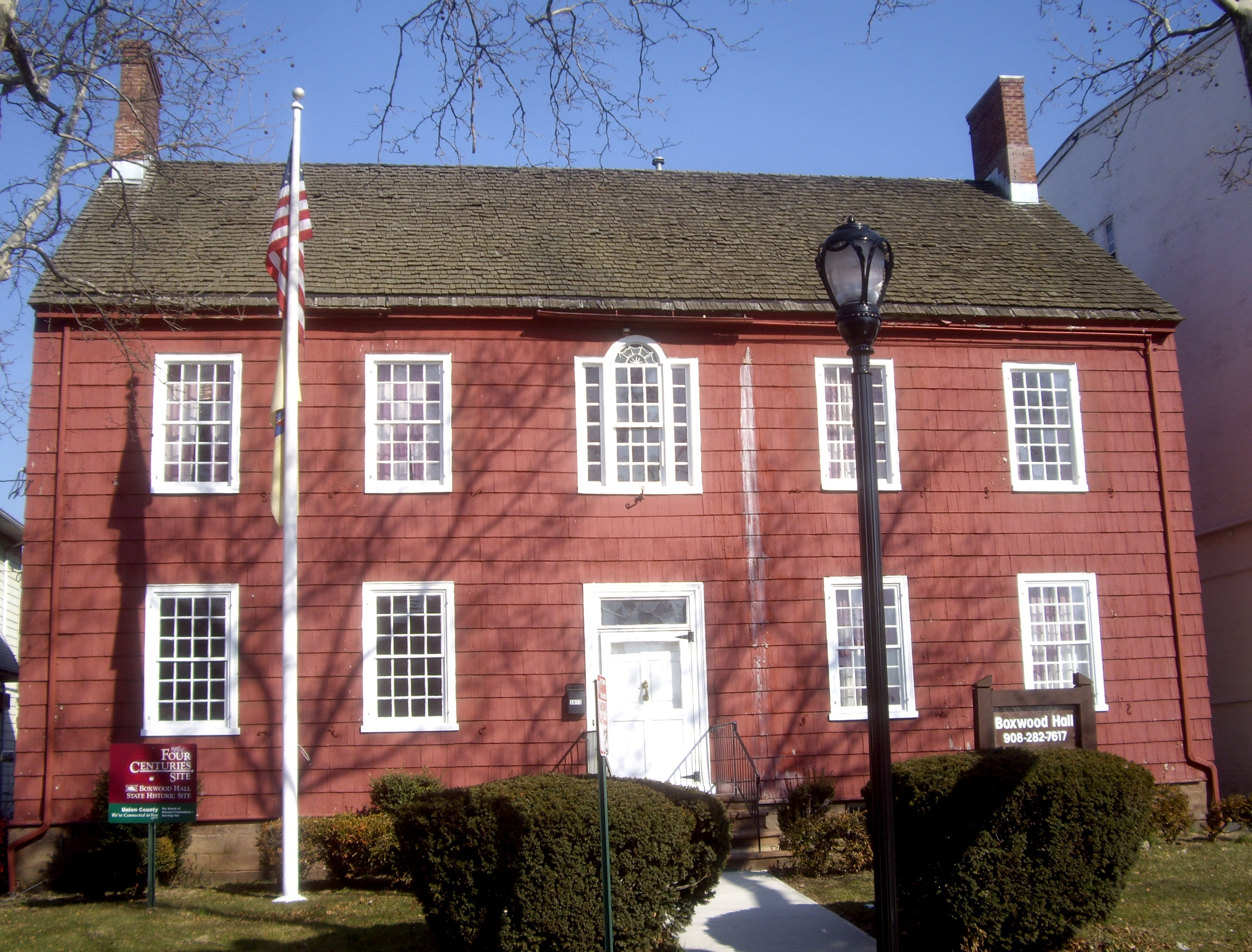

- Location within Union County, New Jersey Location within New Jersey Location within the United States
- Location: 1073 East Jersey Street, Elizabeth, New Jersey, USA
- Coordinates: 40°39′49″N 74°12′37″W
- Area: 0.4 acres (0.16 ha)
- Built: 1750
- Architectural style: Georgian
- NRHP reference No.: 70000397

Significant dates
- Added to NRHP: December 18, 1970
- Designated NHL: November 28, 1972

Boxwood Hall State Historic Site, located at 1073 East Jersey Street in Elizabeth, New Jersey, is a historic house museum operated by the state of New Jersey. Boxwood Hall was built about 1750, and is a National Historic Landmark for its association with Founding Father Elias Boudinot (1740-1821), who lived here from 1772 to 1795. Boudinot, a lawyer, politician, and diplomat, was president of the Continental Congress 1782–83.

In 1772, Alexander Hamilton, another Founding Father, stayed briefly with the Boudinots while attending Elizabethtown Academy. In 1795, Boudinot sold the mansion to Jonathan Dayton, also a Founding Father and then speaker of the U.S. House of Representatives. Dayton lived at Boxwood Hall with his wife until dying in 1824.

== Description and history ==
Boxwood Hall is located east of downtown Elizabeth, on the north side of East Jersey Street between Martin Luther King Jr. Boulevard and Morrell Street. It is a two-story wood-frame structure with a shingled exterior and brick end chimneys. The house has a symmetrical five-bay facade, with a tripartite Palladian window above the center entrance. In its original configuration (ca. 1750) the house had two wings bringing the number of rooms to eighteen. The main block is a classic four-over-four center hall construction.

The property has had many owners and uses in its 250-plus years. Originally it was built by Samuel Woodruff, a merchant and onetime mayor of Elizabethtown. After Woodruff's death in 1768, it passed to his son, but was eventually sold at public auction to Elias Boudinot in 1772. Boudinot lived here with his wife Hannah Stockton Boudinot and their two daughters and also offered shelter to the teen-aged Alexander Hamilton who was studying at the Elizabethtown Academy. The Boudinots remained in the house until the outbreak of the Revolution, when for safety reasons Hannah moved to a family property in Basking Ridge, NJ, and Elias assumed his duties as Commissary General for the Continental armies. It is currently not known how the house was used during the war.

In 1783, the Boudinots returned to their mansion and remained there until selling it in 1795 to Jonathan Dayton, then a Congressman. Dayton and his wife Susan, son Elias Jonathan and daughter Hannah moved into the house in 1795. Soon after, Dayton redecorated the front two rooms on the main floor, installing an Adamesque mantelpiece in the East parlor and a Federal mantelpiece in the West parlor. The financial reversal that was caused by his association with Aaron Burr and by extension with the Burr Conspiracy forced Dayton to sell the mansion to his son-in-law Dr. Oliver Hetfield Spencer while retaining life-rights for the remainder of his and Susan's lives.

== Modern status ==
In the 1930s the building was threatened with demolition, and a nonprofit was formed to rescue it and turn it over to the state. It underwent restoration in the 1940s. The house is owned and operated by the State of New Jersey as a museum, overseen by the New Jersey Department of Environmental Protection, Division of Parks and Forests.

Boxwood Hall was an important place of interest for the "Young Immigrant Hamilton Tour" led by the Alexander Hamilton Awareness Society, as part of the 2014 CelebrateHAMILTON events. The tour took place again in July 2016.

== See also ==
- List of museums in New Jersey
- List of the oldest buildings in New Jersey
- List of National Historic Landmarks in New Jersey
