= First Presbyterian Church of Elizabeth =

Historic church in New Jersey, United States

- U.S. National Register of Historic Places
- New Jersey Register of Historic Places
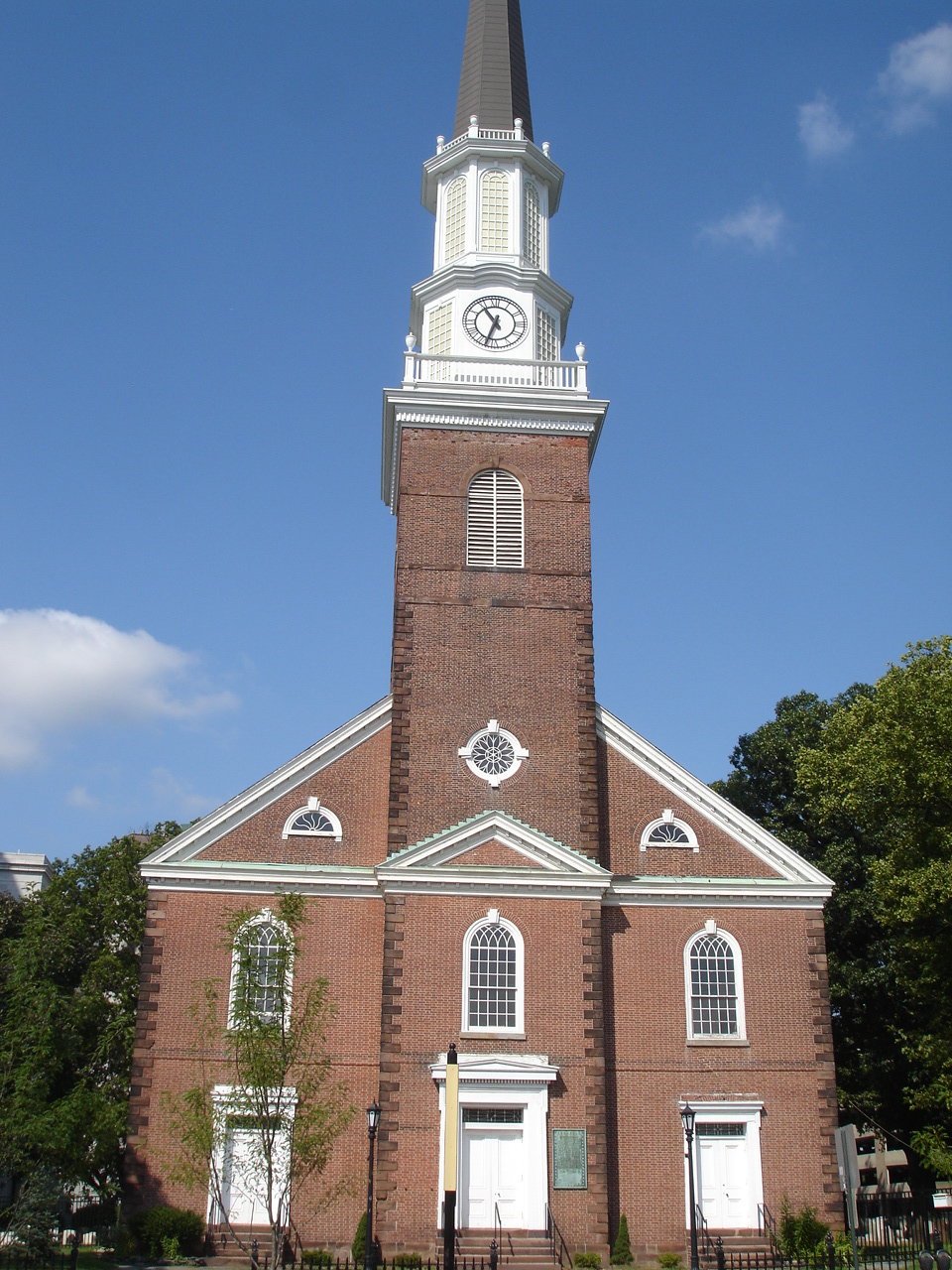
- The First Presbyterian Church of Elizabeth in fall 2011

- Location within Union County, New Jersey Location within New Jersey Location within the United States
- Location: 14–44 Broad Street; Elizabeth, New Jersey
- Coordinates: 40°39′45″N 74°12′56″W
- Area: 3.5 acres (1.4 ha)
- Built: 1783
- Architectural style: Gothic Revival
- NRHP reference No.: 77000914
- NJRHP No.: 2667

Significant dates
- Added to NRHP: May 6, 1977
- Designated NJRHP: October 8, 1976

Siloam Hope First Presbyterian Church of Elizabeth (Old First of Elizabeth and formerly known as the First Presbyterian Church of Elizabeth) is a historic church at 14–44 Broad Street in Elizabeth, Union County, New Jersey, United States. Built in 1783, it was added to the National Register of Historic Places on May 6, 1977, for its significance in architecture and religion.

== History ==
The churchyard dates from 1687 and has over two thousand graves, many from the American Revolutionary War, including the Reverend James Caldwell.

In 2013, a Bible dating from 1699 belonging to founder John Ogden (colonist) was returned to the congregation.

In 2019, the First Presbyterian Church merged with the Siloam Hope Presbyterian Church, becoming the Siloam Hope First Presbyterian Church. The newly merged congregation would remain at its original Broad Street location.

== See also ==
- National Register of Historic Places listings in Union County, New Jersey
