= Marion Johnson =

Marion Johnson may refer to:

- Georgina Masson (1912–1980), born Marion Johnson, British author and photographer
- Marion Lee Johnson, African-American mathematician
