= Plainfield, New Jersey =

City in Union County, New Jersey, US

- City
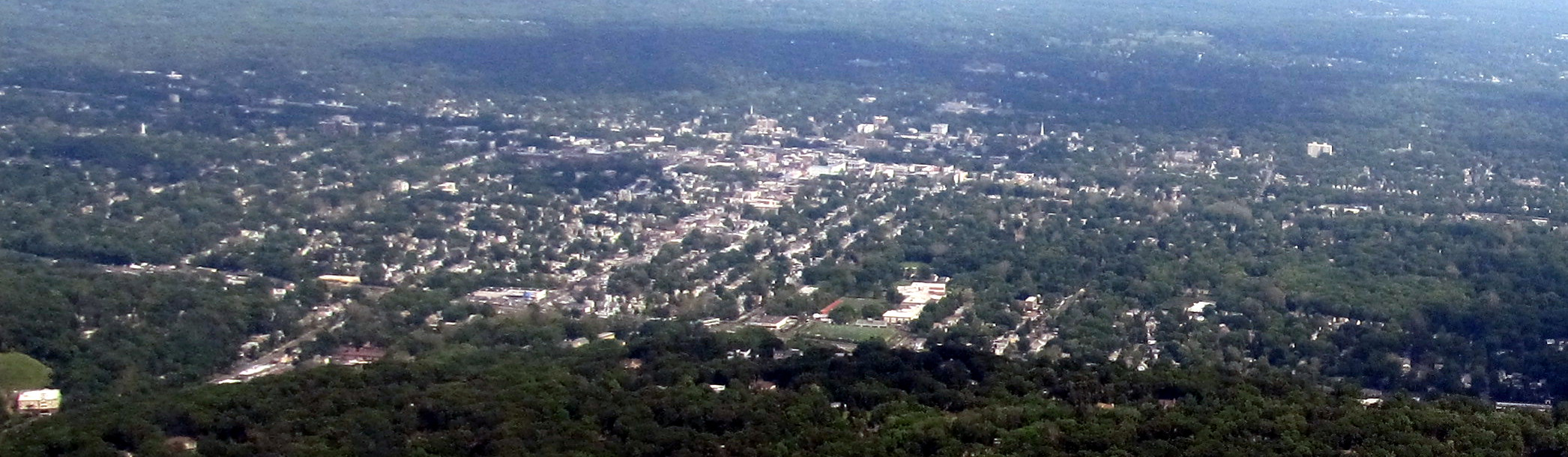
- Aerial photograph of Plainfield

- Seal
- Nickname: The Queen City
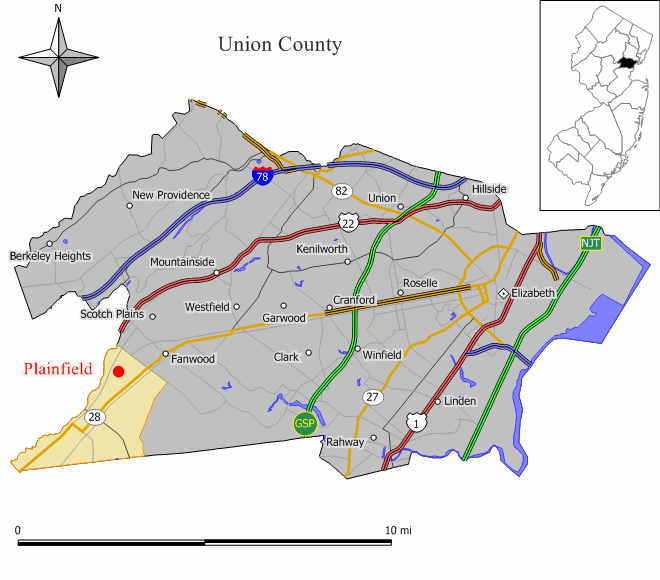
- Location of Plainfield in Union County highlighted in yellow (left). Inset map: Location of Union County in New Jersey highlighted in black (right).

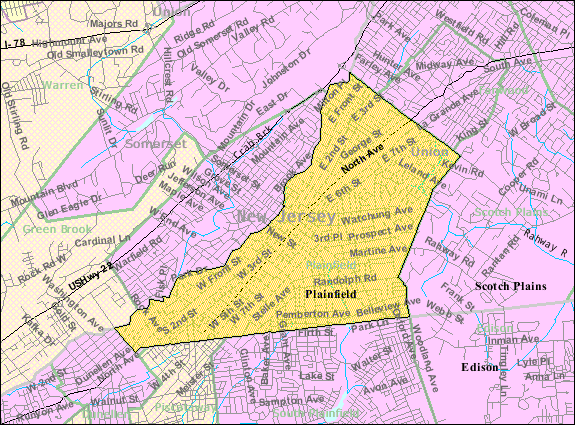
- Census Bureau map of Plainfield, New Jersey
- Interactive map of Plainfield, New Jersey
- Location in Union County Location in New Jersey Location in the United States
- Coordinates: 40.615444°N 74.415775°W
- Country: United States
- State: New Jersey
- County: Union
- Incorporated: April 21, 1869

Government
  - Type: Special charter
  - Body: City Council
  - Mayor: Adrian O. Mapp (D, term ends December 31, 2029)
  - Administrator: Abby Levenson
  - Municipal clerk: Abubakar Jalloh

Area
  - Total: 5.97 sq mi (15.46 km^{2})
  - Land: 5.96 sq mi (15.43 km^{2})
  - Water: 0.0077 sq mi (0.02 km^{2}) 0.15%
  - Rank: 258th of 565 in state 8th of 21 in county
- Elevation: 95 ft (29 m)

Population (2020)
  - Total: 54,586
  - Estimate (2023): 54,670
  - Rank: 738th in country (as of 2022); 34th of 565 in state 3rd of 21 in county
  - Density: 9,160.3/sq mi (3,536.8/km^{2})
  - Rank: 41st of 565 in state 3rd of 21 in county
- Time zone: UTC−05:00 (Eastern (EST))
  - Summer (DST): UTC−04:00 (Eastern (EDT))
- ZIP Codes: 07060–07063
- Area codes: 732 and 908
- FIPS code: 3403959190
- GNIS feature ID: 0885355
- Website: www.plainfieldnj.gov

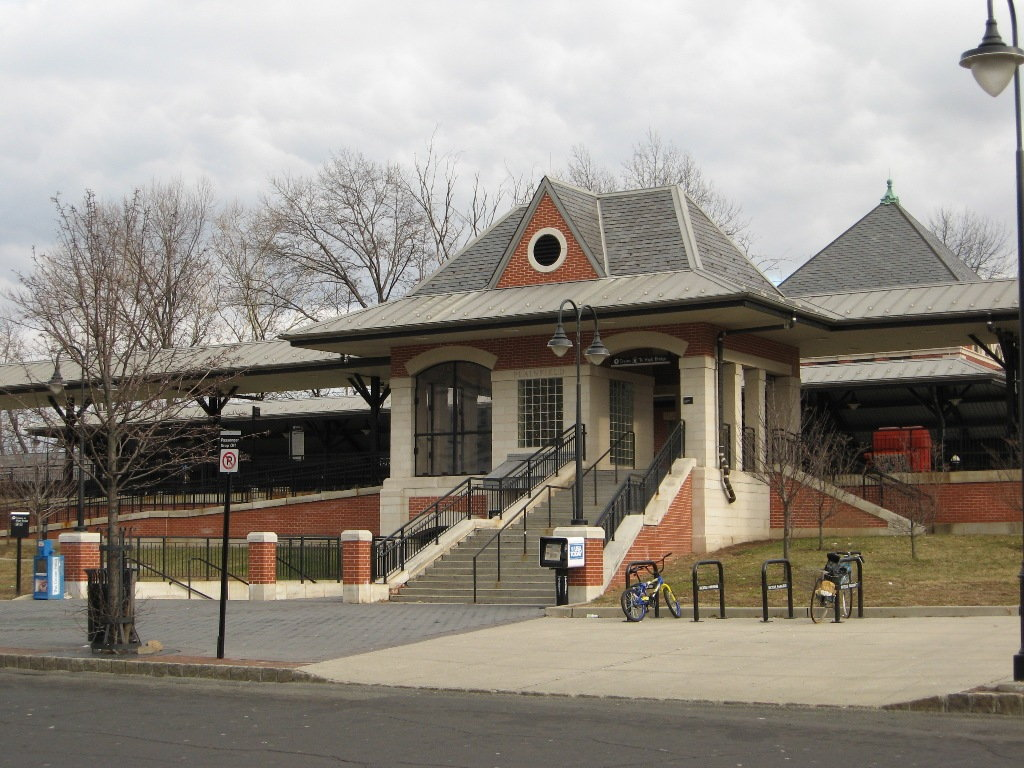
Downtown Plainfield Train Station, one of two stations running to New York City on the Raritan Valley Line

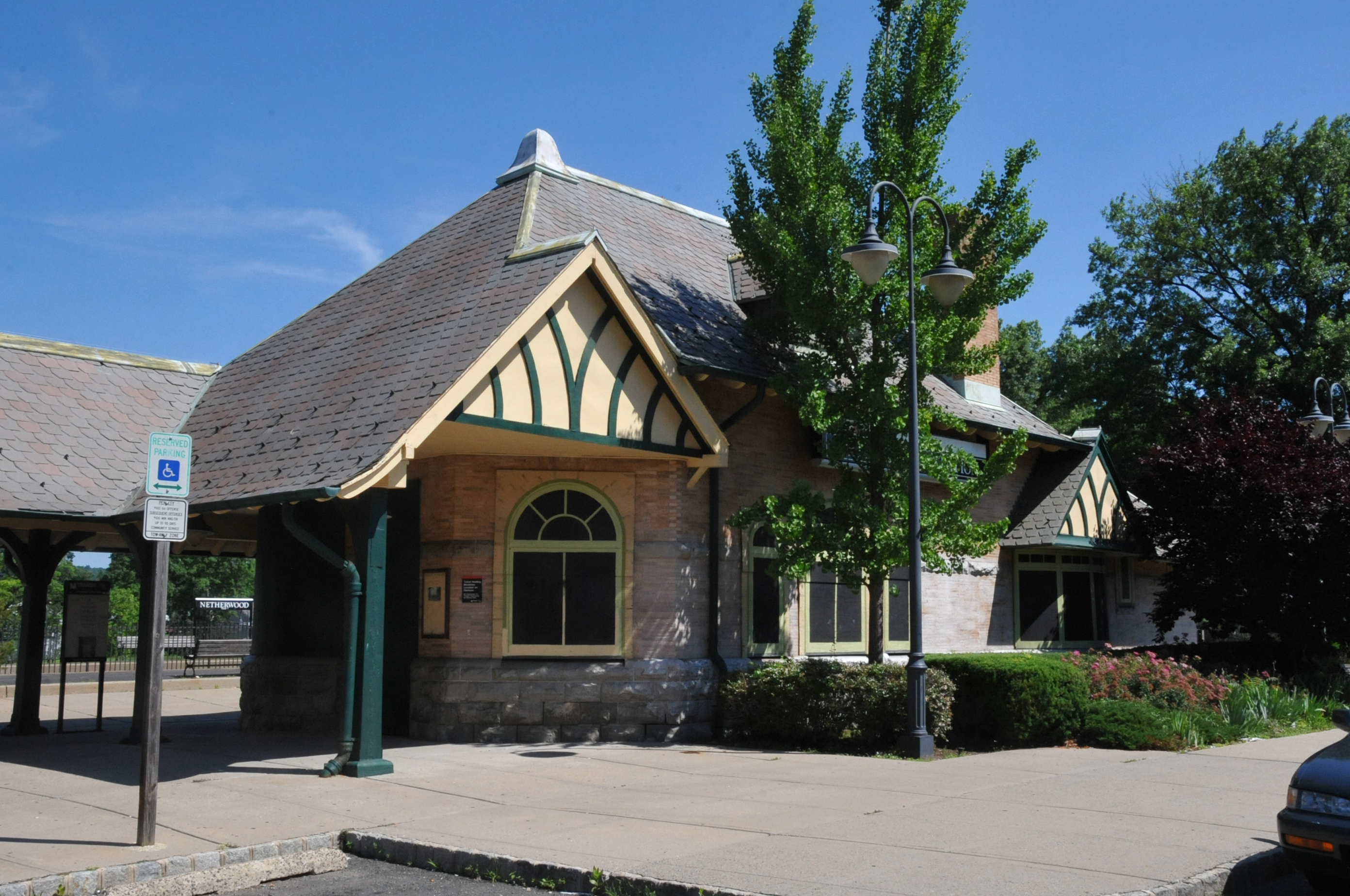
Netherwood station on the Raritan Valley Line to Newark/New York, one of two train stations in Plainfield

Plainfield is a city in Union County, in the U.S. state of New Jersey. Nicknamed "The Queen City," it serves as both a regional hub for Central New Jersey and a bedroom suburb of the New York Metropolitan area, located in the Raritan Valley region. As of the 2020 United States census, the city's population, majority Latino for the first time, was 54,586. This was an increase of 4,778 (+9.6%) from the 2010 census count of 49,808, which in turn reflected an increase of 1,979 (+4.1%) from the 47,829 counted in the 2000 census. In 2023, the Census Bureau estimated the city's population to be 54,670.

The area of present-day Plainfield was originally formed as Plainfield Township, a township that was created on April 5, 1847, from portions of Westfield Township, while the area was still part of Essex County. On March 19, 1857, Plainfield Township became part of the newly created Union County.

Plainfield was incorporated as a city by an act of the New Jersey Legislature on April 21, 1869, from portions of Plainfield Township, based on the results of a referendum held that same day. The city and township coexisted until March 6, 1878, when Plainfield Township was dissolved and parts were absorbed by Plainfield city, with the remainder becoming Fanwood Township (since renamed as Scotch Plains).

The name "Plainfield", also used in both North Plainfield and South Plainfield, is derived from a local estate or from its scenic location.

== History ==
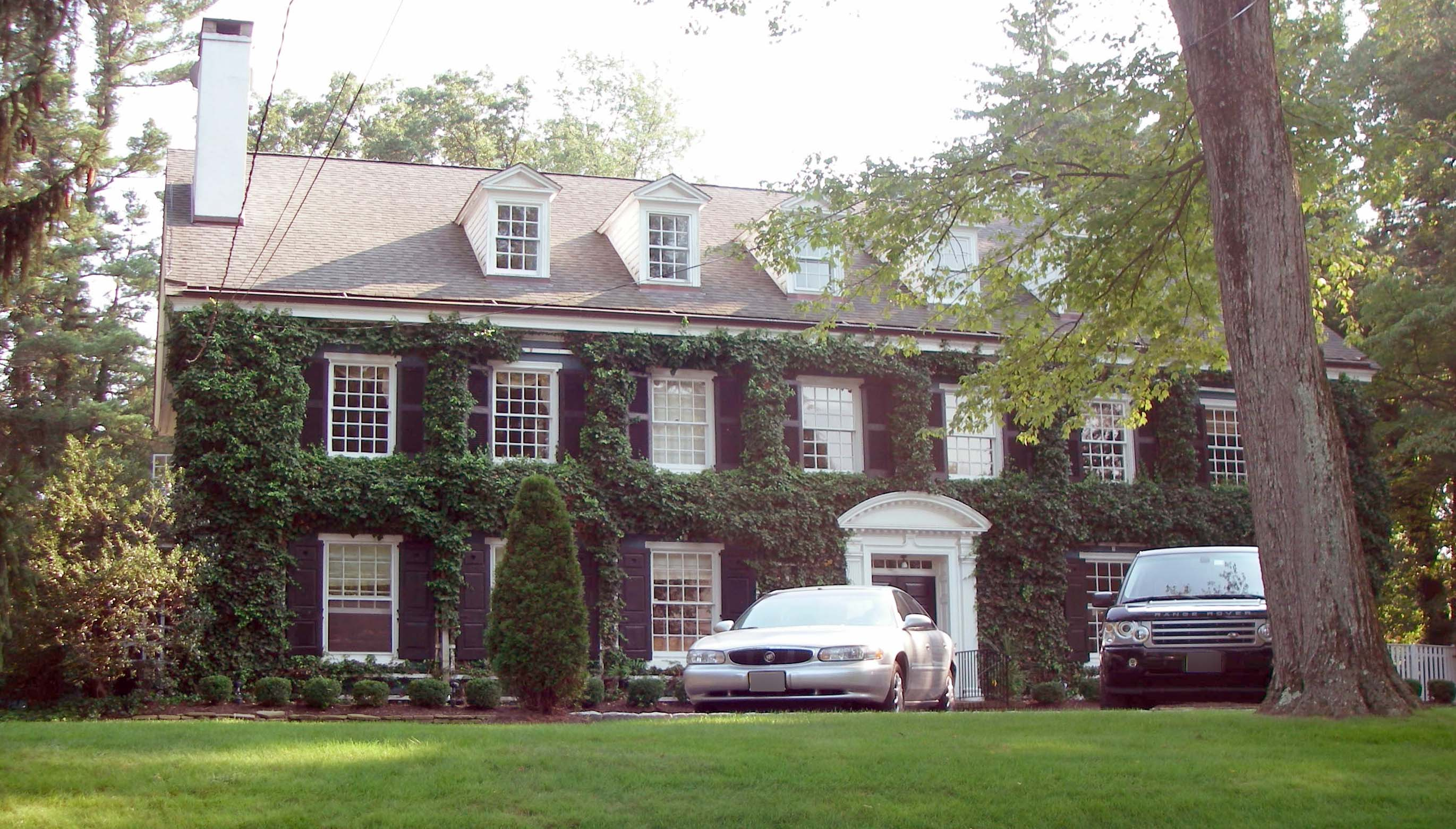
Home of former Governor Jim McGreevey

=== Early history ===
Plainfield was settled in 1684 by Quakers, and incorporated as a city in 1869. Formerly a bedroom suburb in the New York metropolitan area, it has become the urban center of 10 closely allied municipalities, with diversified industries, including printing and the manufacture of chemicals, clothing, electronic equipment, and vehicular parts. Among the several 18th-century buildings remaining are a Friends' meetinghouse (1788), the Martine house (1717), and the Nathaniel Drake House (1746), known as George Washington's headquarters during the Battle of Short Hills in June 1777. Nearby Washington Rock is a prominent point of the Watchung Mountains and is reputed to be the vantage point from which Washington watched British troop movements.

The "Queen City" moniker arose in the second half of the 19th century. Plainfield had been developing a reputation during this period as featuring a climate that was beneficial for respiratory ailments. In 1886, in an effort to publicize the climate, local newspaper publisher Thomas W. Morrison began to use the slogan "Colorado of the East" to promote Plainfield. As Denver, Colorado, was known as the "Queen City of the Plains," the slogan for Plainfield eventually became abbreviated to "The Queen City."

In 1902, the New Jersey Legislature approved measures that would have allowed the borough of North Plainfield to become part of Union County (a measure repealed in 1903) and to allow for a merger of North Plainfield with the City of Plainfield subject to the approval of a referendum by voters in both municipalities.

=== Music history ===
Plainfield is the birthplace of P-Funk. George Clinton founded The Parliaments while working in a Plainfield barber shop. Parliament-Funkadelic was inducted in the Rock and Roll Hall of Fame in 1997. A number of other well-known musicians are from, or have resided, in Plainfield.

=== Sports history ===
In sports history, Plainfield is the birthplace and/or home of several current and former athletes, including professionals and well-known amateurs. Included in their number are Milt Campbell, the 1956 Olympic Decathlon gold medalist (the first African-American to earn this title), Joe Black, the first African-American pitcher to win a World Series game; Jeff Torborg, former MLB player, coach and manager; former Duke University and Chicago Bulls basketball player Jay Williams; and the NFL player Vic Washington

=== Architectural history ===
Plainfield's history as a place to call home for the 19th and 20th century wealthy has led to a significant and preserved suburban architectural legacy. An influx of Wall Street money led to the creation of what was called Millionaires' Row after the opening of the railway in the 19th century.

There are numerous sites, including homes, parks, and districts in the city that are listed on the National Register of Historic Places. While not listed, the Plainfield Armory, a prominent landmark completed in 1932, was sold by the state in 2013 as surplus property.

Plainfield's wealthy northeast corner, known as the "Sleepy Hollow" section of the city, was and still is characterized by its array of finely landscaped streets and neighborhoods with homes defined by a broad array of architectural styles, most built during the first half of the twentieth century. From the tree-lined neighborhoods, the lot sizes vary, but the stateliness and distinction of each house is evident, whether a stately Queen Anne mansion or a gingerbread cottage. Most lots are nicely landscaped and semi- or fully private.

Plainfield has been home to former New Jersey governor James McGreevey.

=== Rebellion ===
Plainfield was affected by the Plainfield Rebellion in July 1967. This civil disturbance occurred in the wake of the larger Newark riots. A Plainfield police officer was killed, about fifty people were injured, and several hundred thousand dollars of property was damaged by looting and arson. The New Jersey National Guard restored order after three days of unrest. This civil unrest caused a massive white flight, characterized by the percentage of Black residents rising from 40% in 1970 to 60% a decade later.

Author and Plainfield native Isaiah Tremaine published Insurrection in 2017 as a mournful accounting of the Plainfield riots—and subsequent racial tensions at Plainfield High School—from his perspective as a Black teenager living in the city with both white and Black friends at the time. Prior to the rebellion, Plainfield was a regional shopping and entertainment center. Residents of nearby Union, Middlesex and Somerset counties would drive to shop and explore the business districts of Plainfield. Other than during the holidays, peak shopping times Plainfield were Thursday nights and Saturday, when Front Street and the areas around it bustled.

Plainfield had several entertainment venues at that time. At the peak, there were four operating movie theaters: the Strand, the Liberty, the Paramount and the Oxford theaters.

Manufacturers of heavy goods included Chelsea Fan Corp., Mack Truck and National Starch and Chemical Corp. Plainfield Iron and Metal maintained a large scrapyard in the West End.

=== Natural disasters ===
In 2025, Plainfield and surrounding communities were affected by two separate natural disasters in the span of two weeks. On July 3, three people were killed when severe thunderstorms swept through the area. Heavy damage occurred when the storms brought down trees and powerlines, leaving 8,000 residents without power. Following the storms, Mayor Adrian O. Mapp issued a state of emergency. The state of emergency was lifted on July 9. Five days later, on July 14, flash floods killed two women when their car was swept into the Cedar Brook, designed to catch and drain all of the city's flood water.

== Geography ==
According to the United States Census Bureau, the city had a total area of 5.97 square miles (15.5 km^{2}), including 5.96 square miles (15.4 km^{2}) of land and 0.01 square miles (0.026 km^{2}) of water (0.15%).

Unincorporated communities, localities and place names located partially or completely within the city include Netherwood.

The city is located in Central Jersey on the southwestern edge of Union County and is bordered by nine municipalities. In Union County are Scotch Plains to the north and east and Fanwood to the northeast. In Middlesex County, are South Plainfield and Piscataway to the south; Dunellen to the southwest and Edison to the southeast. In Somerset County, Green Brook Township lies to the northwest, North Plainfield lies to the north and Watchung borders to the northwest.

Plainfield is in the Raritan Valley, a line of cities in central New Jersey, and lies on the east side of the Raritan Valley along with Edison.

The Robinson's Branch of the Rahway River additionally flows through Plainfield en route to the Robinson's Branch Reservoir.

=== Climate ===
Plainfield has a humid continental climate, characterized by brisk to cold winters and hot, muggy summers. The lowest temperature ever recorded was −17 °F (−27 °C) on February 9, 1934, and the highest temperature ever recorded was 106 °F (41 °C) on July 10, 1936, and August 11, 1949. According to the Köppen Climate Classification system, Plainfield has a humid subtropical climate, which is abbreviated as "Cfa" on climate maps.

Climate data for Plainfield, New Jersey (1981–2010 normals)
Month	Jan	Feb	Mar	Apr	May	Jun	Jul	Aug	Sep	Oct	Nov	Dec	Year
Mean daily maximum °F (°C)	39.3 (4.1)	43.4 (6.3)	52.5 (11.4)	63.9 (17.7)	74.1 (23.4)	82.6 (28.1)	86.8 (30.4)	85.1 (29.5)	77.7 (25.4)	65.9 (18.8)	54.9 (12.7)	43.4 (6.3)	64.1 (17.8)
Mean daily minimum °F (°C)	23.3 (−4.8)	25.4 (−3.7)	31.7 (−0.2)	41.0 (5.0)	50.2 (10.1)	59.8 (15.4)	65.0 (18.3)	63.4 (17.4)	55.7 (13.2)	44.2 (6.8)	36.0 (2.2)	27.8 (−2.3)	43.6 (6.5)
Average precipitation inches (mm)	3.70 (94)	2.91 (74)	4.29 (109)	3.77 (96)	4.22 (107)	4.12 (105)	5.30 (135)	3.58 (91)	4.64 (118)	4.30 (109)	3.90 (99)	3.72 (94)	48.44 (1,230)
Average snowfall inches (cm)	8.0 (20)	10.0 (25)	3.6 (9.1)	0.8 (2.0)	0 (0)	0 (0)	0 (0)	0 (0)	0 (0)	0 (0)	0.8 (2.0)	4.0 (10)	27.2 (69)
Average precipitation days (≥ 0.01 in)	9.7	8.3	9.5	10.9	10.3	10.0	9.4	8.8	8.3	8.3	9.1	9.7	112.3
Average snowy days (≥ 0.1 in)	2.9	2.0	1.4	0.2	0	0	0	0	0	0	0.2	1.4	8.1
Source: NOAA

== Demographics ==
Plainfield has seen a rapid rise in its Latino community in recent decades. The city's population is now majority Hispanic for the first time, as of the 2020 census.

Historical population
Census	Pop.	Note	%±
1870	5,095		—
1880	8,125		59.5%
1890	11,267		38.7%
1900	15,369		36.4%
1910	20,550		33.7%
1920	27,700		34.8%
1930	34,422		24.3%
1940	37,469		8.9%
1950	42,366		13.1%
1960	45,330		7.0%
1970	46,862		3.4%
1980	45,555		−2.8%
1990	46,567		2.2%
2000	47,829		2.7%
2010	49,808		4.1%
2020	54,586		9.6%
2023 (est.)	54,670		0.2%
Population sources: 1870–1920; 1860–1870 1870 1880–1890; 1890–1910 1870–1930; 1940–2000 2000; 2010 2020

=== Racial and ethnic composition ===
Plainfield city, New Jersey – Racial and ethnic composition Note: the US Census treats Hispanic/Latino as an ethnic category. This table excludes Latinos from the racial categories and assigns them to a separate category. Hispanics/Latinos may be of any race.
Race / Ethnicity (NH = Non-Hispanic)	Pop 1990	Pop 2000	Pop 2010	Pop 2020	% 1990	% 2000	% 2010	% 2020
White alone (NH)	9,140	5,508	4,139	3,383	19.63%	11.52%	8.31%	6.20%
Black or African American alone (NH)	29,641	28,698	24,069	19,034	63.65%	60.00%	48.32%	34.87%
Native American or Alaska Native alone (NH)	203	91	97	104	0.44%	0.19%	0.19%	0.19%
Asian alone (NH)	419	428	439	500	0.90%	0.89%	0.88%	0.92%
Pacific Islander alone (NH)	N/A	31	18	8	N/A	0.06%	0.04%	0.01%
Other Race alone (NH)	168	120	192	634	0.36%	0.25%	0.39%	1.16%
Mixed Race or Multi-Racial (NH)	N/A	920	749	1,131	N/A	1.92%	1.50%	2.07%
Hispanic or Latino (any race)	6,996	12,033	20,105	29,792	15.02%	25.16%	40.37%	54.58%
Total	46,567	47,829	49,808	54,586	100.00%	100.00%	100.00%	100.00%

=== 2020 census ===
As of the 2020 census, Plainfield had a population of 54,586. The median age was 33.8 years. 27.5% of residents were under the age of 18 and 11.3% of residents were 65 years of age or older. For every 100 females there were 99.3 males, and for every 100 females age 18 and over there were 97.8 males age 18 and over.

100.0% of residents lived in urban areas, while 0.0% lived in rural areas.

There were 16,308 households in Plainfield, of which 43.6% had children under the age of 18 living in them. Of all households, 39.0% were married-couple households, 20.1% were households with a male householder and no spouse or partner present, and 32.3% were households with a female householder and no spouse or partner present. About 21.1% of all households were made up of individuals and 8.5% had someone living alone who was 65 years of age or older.

There were 17,125 housing units, of which 4.8% were vacant. The homeowner vacancy rate was 1.9% and the rental vacancy rate was 3.4%.

Racial composition as of the 2020 census
Race	Number	Percent
White	5,455	10.0%
Black or African American	19,611	35.9%
American Indian and Alaska Native	1,063	1.9%
Asian	523	1.0%
Native Hawaiian and Other Pacific Islander	30	0.1%
Some other race	21,061	38.6%
Two or more races	6,843	12.5%
Hispanic or Latino (of any race)	29,792	54.6%

=== 2010 census ===
The 2010 United States census counted 49,808 people, 15,180 households, and 10,884 families in the city. The population density was 8,270.1 per square mile (3,193.1/km^{2}). There were 16,621 housing units at an average density of 2,759.8 per square mile (1,065.6/km^{2}). The racial makeup was 23.54% (11,724) White, 50.20% (25,006) Black or African American, 0.91% (455) Native American, 0.95% (474) Asian, 0.05% (26) Pacific Islander, 20.13% (10,024) from other races, and 4.21% (2,099) from two or more races. Hispanic or Latino of any race were 40.37% (20,105) of the population.

Of the 15,180 households, 35.2% had children under the age of 18; 37.9% were married couples living together; 24.1% had a female householder with no husband present and 28.3% were non-families. Of all households, 21.3% were made up of individuals and 7.6% had someone living alone who was 65 years of age or older. The average household size was 3.23 and the average family size was 3.60.

25.8% of the population were under the age of 18, 10.5% from 18 to 24, 30.7% from 25 to 44, 23.5% from 45 to 64, and 9.5% who were 65 years of age or older. The median age was 33.3 years. For every 100 females, the population had 101.3 males. For every 100 females ages 18 and older there were 100.4 males.

The Census Bureau's 2006–2010 American Community Survey showed that (in 2010 inflation-adjusted dollars) median household income was $52,056 (with a margin of error of +/− $3,048) and the median family income was $58,942 (+/− $4,261). Males had a median income of $33,306 (+/− $4,132) versus $37,265 (+/− $3,034) for females. The per capita income for the borough was $23,767 (+/− $1,013). About 12.2% of families and 16.8% of the population were below the poverty line, including 23.5% of those under age 18 and 16.0% of those age 65 or over.

=== 2000 census ===
As of the 2000 United States census of 2000, there were 47,829 people, 15,137 households, and 10,898 families residing in the city. The population density was 7,921.7 people per square mile (3,058.6 people/km^{2}). There were 16,180 housing units at an average density of 2,679.8 per square mile (1,034.7/km^{2}). The racial makeup of the city was 21.45% White, 61.78% African American, 0.41% Native American, 0.93% Asian, 0.10% Pacific Islander, 10.78% from other races, and 4.55% from two or more races. Hispanic or Latino of any race were 25.16% of the population.

There were 15,137 households, out of which 35.5% had children under the age of 18 living with them, 39.3% were married couples living together, 24.5% had a female householder with no husband present, and 28.0% were non-families. 21.1% of all households were made up of individuals, and 7.4% had someone living alone who was 65 years of age or older. The average household size was 3.10 and the average family size was 3.49.

In the city the population was spread out, with 27.5% under the age of 18, 10.2% from 18 to 24, 32.6% from 25 to 44, 20.5% from 45 to 64, and 9.2% who were 65 years of age or older. The median age was 33 years. For every 100 females, there were 95.7 males. For every 100 females age 18 and over, there were 92.2 males.

The median income for a household in the city was $46,683, and the median income for a family was $50,774. Males had a median income of $33,460 versus $30,408 for females. The per capita income for the city was $19,052. About 12.2% of families and 15.9% of the population were below the poverty line, including 21.3% of those under age 18 and 12.6% of those age 65 or over.

== Economy ==
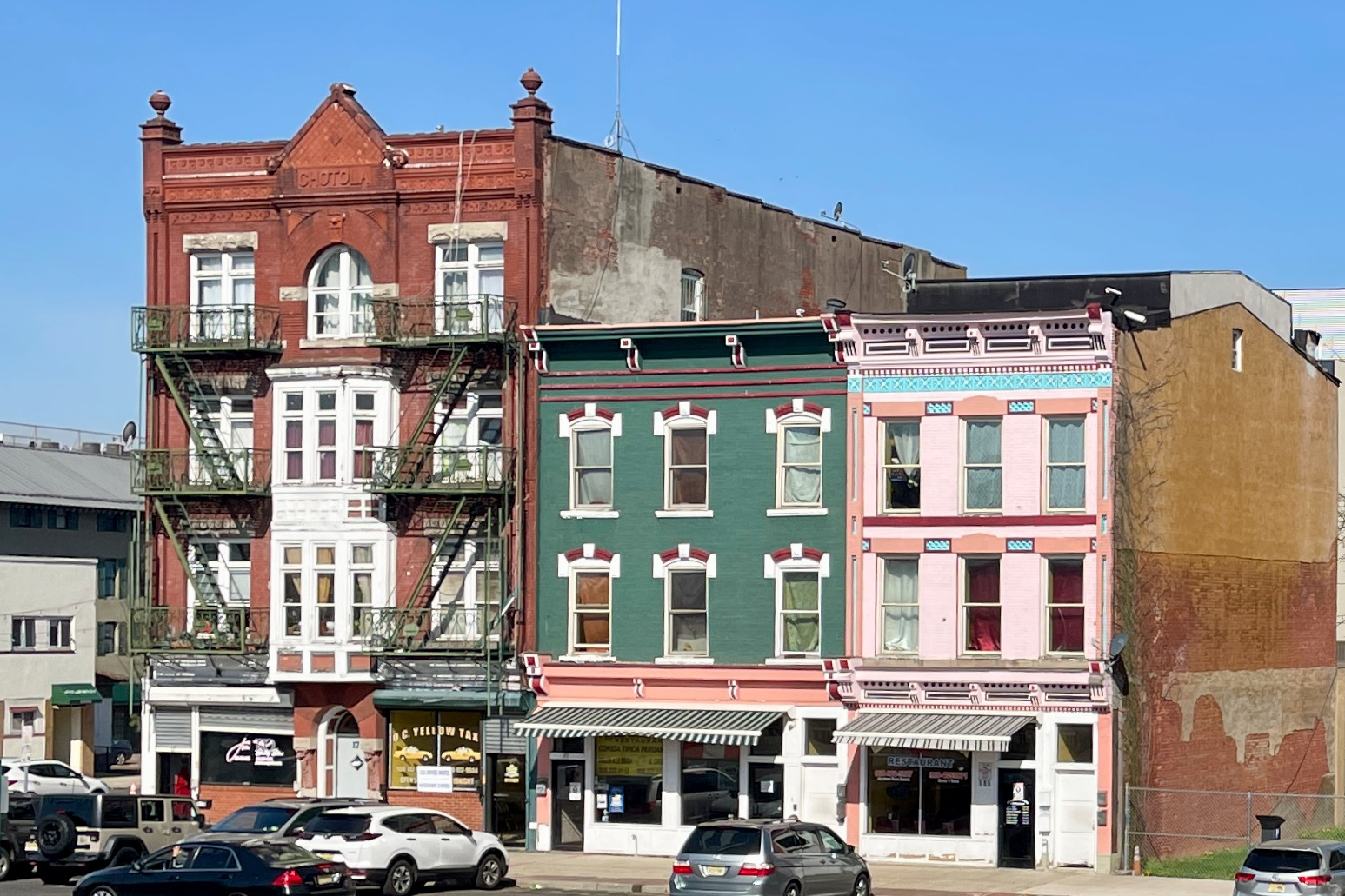
North Avenue Commercial District

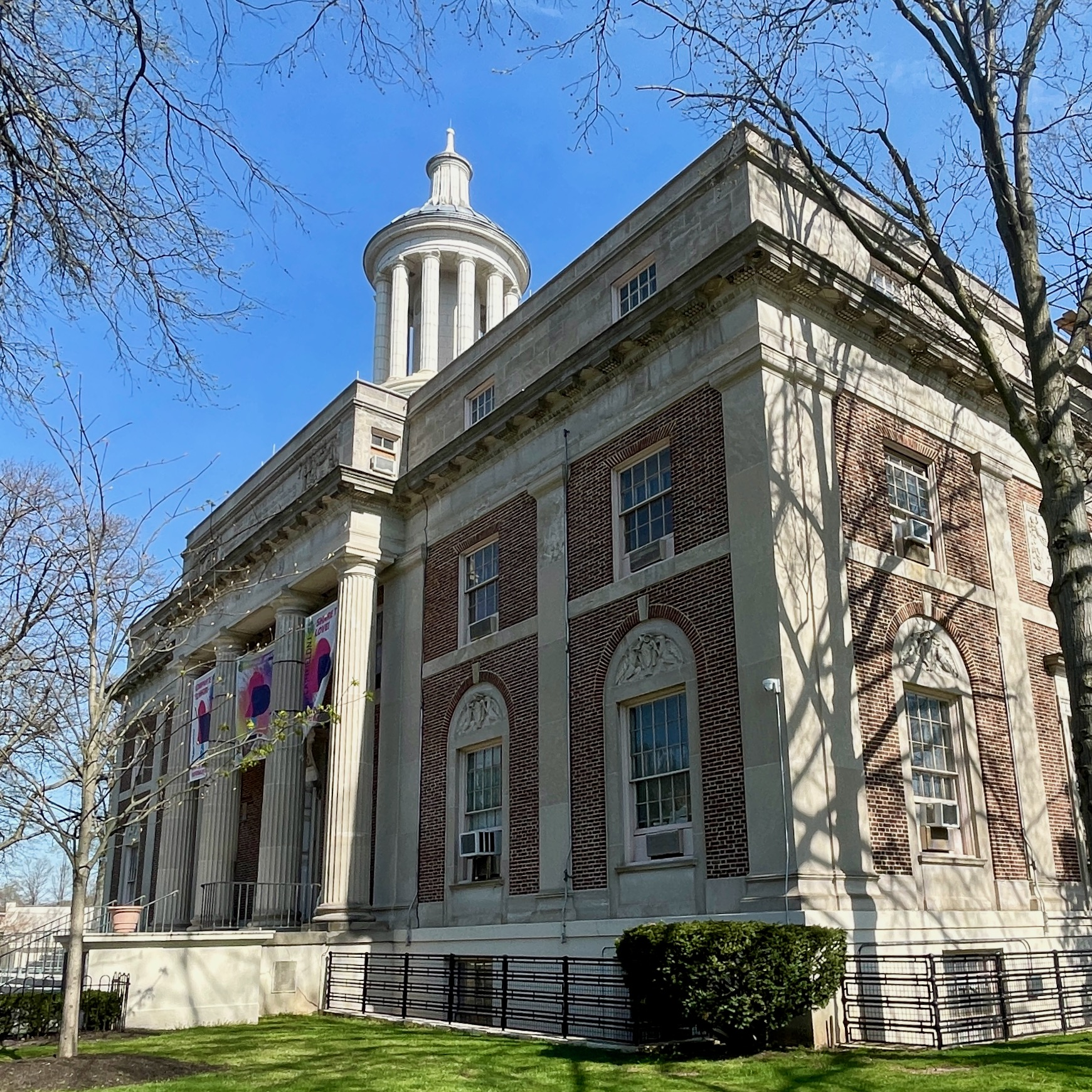
City Hall in the Plainfield Civic District

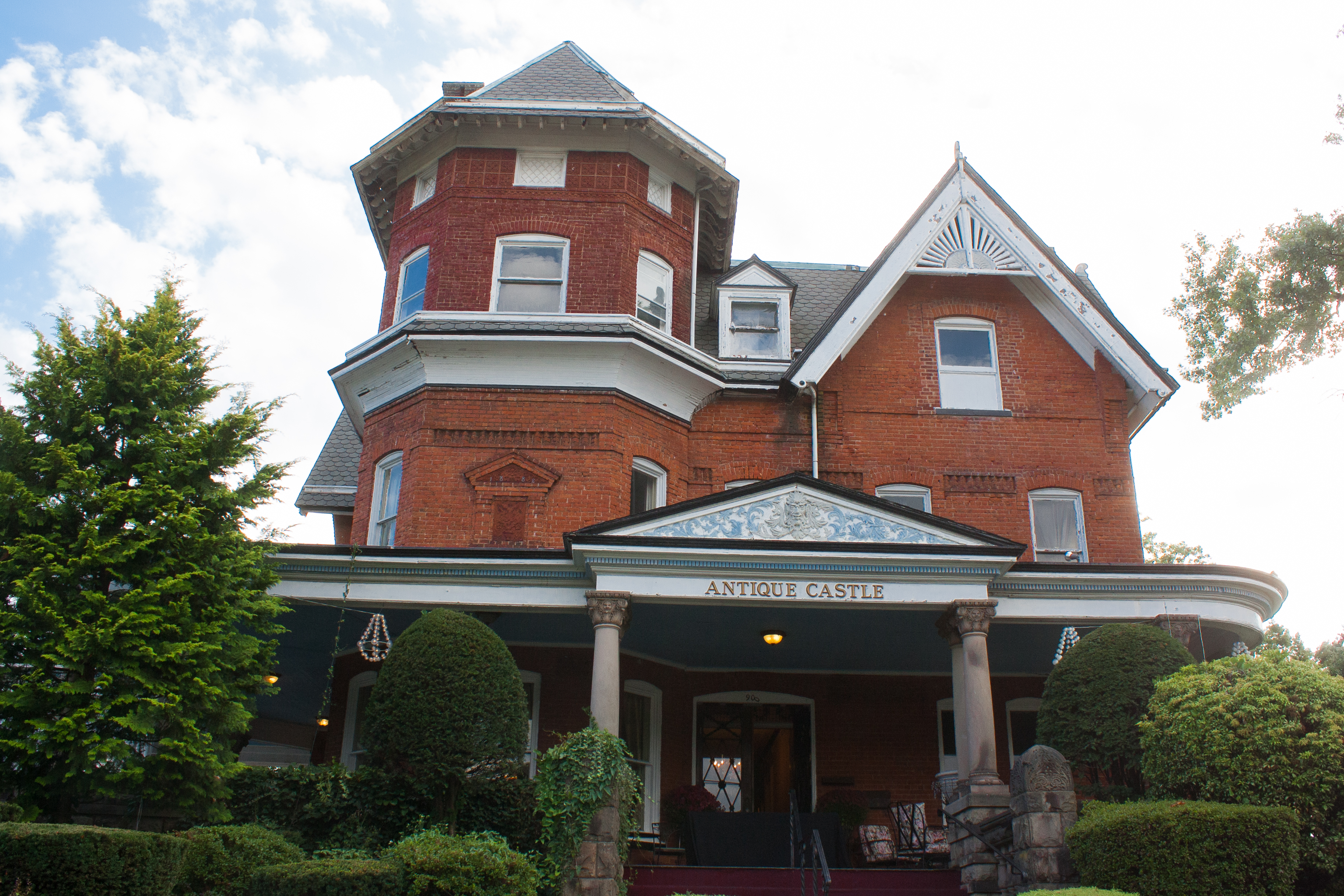
The Orville Taylor Waring House in Plainfield

Portions of Plainfield are part of an Urban Enterprise Zone. The city was selected in 1983 as one of the initial group of 10 zones chosen to participate in the program. In addition to other benefits to encourage employment within the Zone, shoppers can take advantage of a reduced 3.3125% sales tax rate (half of the 6 5/8% rate charged statewide) at eligible merchants. Established in January 1986, the city's Urban Enterprise Zone status expires in December 2023.

The UEZ program in Plainfield and four other original UEZ cities had been allowed to lapse as of January 1, 2017, after Governor Chris Christie, who called the program an "abject failure", vetoed a compromise bill that would have extended the status for two years. In May 2018, Governor Phil Murphy signed a law that reinstated the program in these five cities and extended the expiration date in other zones.

Downtown Plainfield has two historic commercial districts: the North Avenue Commercial District and the Plainfield Civic District. Both are on the National Register of Historic Places.

- The North Avenue Commercial District features the Downtown train station, post office, and Plainfield National Bank (now PNC Bank). The architecture of the district reflects original exterior 19th and early 20th century façade architecture.
- The Plainfield Civic District features architecture reflective of the turn-of-the-century City Beautiful Movement, including the City Hall building, YMCA, City Hall Annex, and World War I monument on Watchung Avenue.

Events such as the Christmas Tree Lighting, the Queen City 5k, Fire Safety Fair, and Mayor's Wellness Walk take place in the Downtown each year.

Downtown Plainfield Alliance (DPA) is a "nonpolitical, nonprofit grassroots group that supports the improvement of Downtown Plainfield through beautification, volunteerism, economic development, marketing, community development, and activism."

== Historic districts ==
Portrait of Van Wyck Brooks, for which the district is named, by John Butler Yeats, 1909

The restoration of large 19th century-era Plainfield estates to their original glory, such as the Craig Marsh home, has been featured in various home design magazine coverage. Residential districts include:

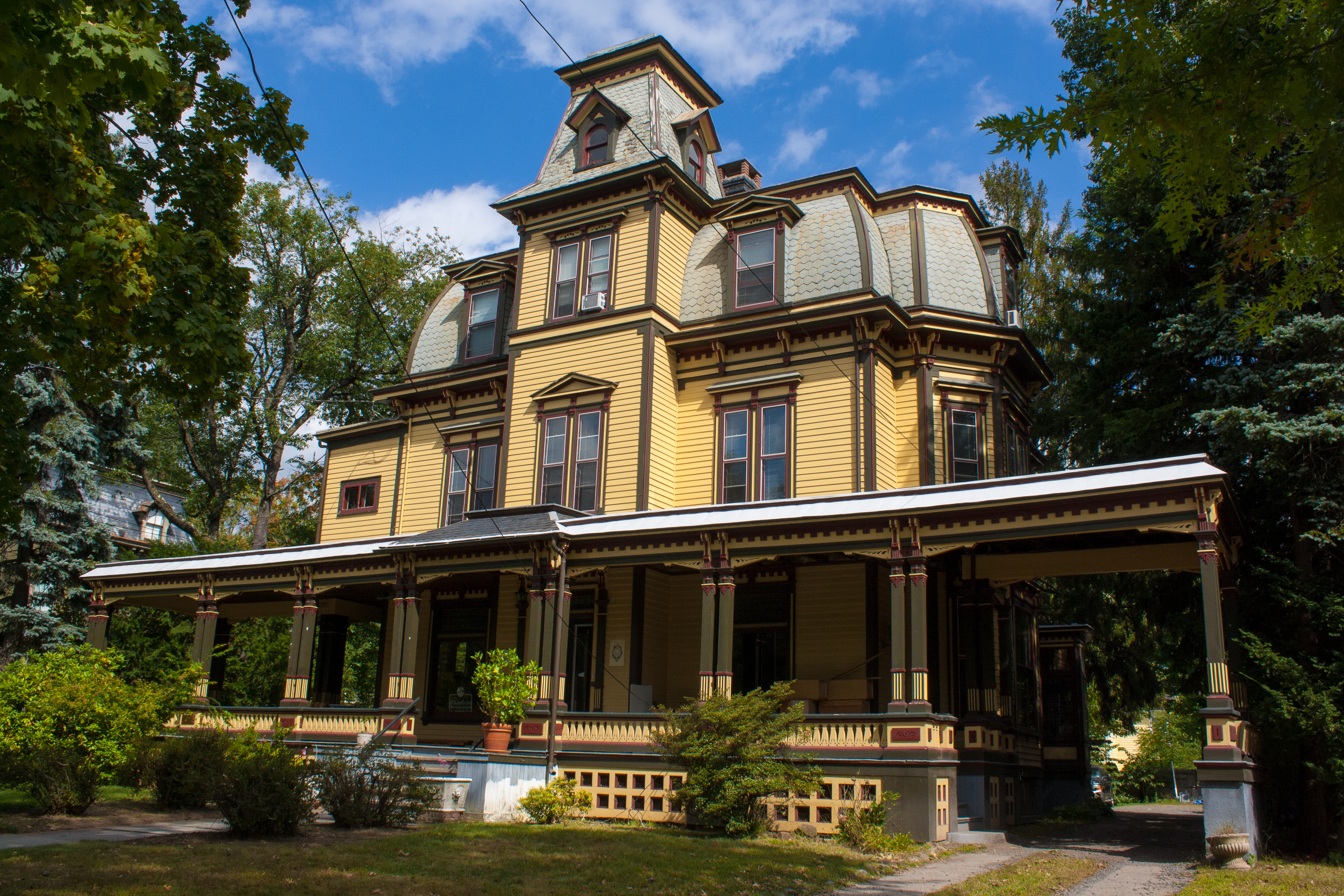
Van Wyck Brooks Historic District

- Van Wyck Brooks Historic District, which includes more than 150 properties, was listed in This Old House magazine's 2012 list of "Best Old House Neighborhoods." Roughly bounded by Plainfield Avenue, West Eighth Street, Park Avenue, West Ninth Street and Madison Avenue, and Randolph Road, it was named for literary critic and native son Van Wyck Brooks. In addition to the above-mentioned Craig Marsh home, it also contains the largest residence in Plainfield (The Coriell Mansion) and a wide variety of other historically and architecturally notable homes. The Van Wyck Brooks Historic District is the largest of the six residential Historic Districts in Plainfield, its oldest structure the Manning Stelle Farmhouse, parts of which date back to 1803. It has been a designated historic district by the City of Plainfield since 1982, and was added to the National Register of Historic Places in 1985.
- Netherwood Heights Historic District is named for the Netherwood Hotel which stood at what is now the blocks bordered by Denmark Road, Park Terrace, Belvidere Avenue, Berkeley Avenue. This district is located near the Netherwood Train Station
- Crescent Area Historic District
- Hillside Avenue Historic District
- Sleepy Hollow is, as of 2018, a section of stately homes on winding roads on the northeast side of the city. Some have pushed to formalize its boundaries.

== The West End ==
While the more affluent eastern part of the city has been relatively integrated over the decades, with both Black and white upper-middle-class-to-wealthy families, the West End of Plainfield is the historically middle-class and working-class Black district in the city and features a close-knit African-American community.

Part of the West End is known to locals as Soulville.

Mount Olive Baptist Church has been serving the West End as a community of faith since 1870. It is considered Plainfield's first Black church. As the Black community grew, other congregations branched off from Mount Olive.

Calvary Baptist Church began in 1897 among a group of Black congregants from Mount Olive, and celebrated its 120th anniversary in 2017 with a series of events.

Nearby, Shiloh Baptist Church was founded in 1908, also by Mount Olive congregants, and offers many faith-based events to the community, including its Jazz for Jesus program.

The West End has been eyed recently for redevelopment.

The White Star, a diner in the West End on West Front Street near Green Brook Park, has been an area meeting spot and landmark for over half a century.

The West End has grown more Latino in recent years. As of the 2020 census, 51% of all people living in Plainfield were of Hispanic origin. This was up from 25% in 2000 and 40% in 2010.

In his book Insurrection, Isaiah Tremaine, a Black Plainfield native, credits the influx of Latinos for breathing new life and energy into a city hurting from racism and racial strife in the 1970s.

=== Parliament-Funkadelic Way ===
The West End was once home to the Silk Palace, a barbershop at 216 Plainfield Avenue owned in part by funk music legend George Clinton, staffed by various members of Parliament-Funkadelic, and known as the "hangout for all the local singers and musicians" in Plainfield's 1950s and 1960s doo-wop, soul, rock and proto-funk music scene.

In 2022, the city of Plainfield renamed a section of Plainfield Avenue, from its intersection with Front Street to its intersection with West Fifth Street, as "Parliament Funkadelic Way" in honor of its musical history.

== LGBTQ+ community ==
A sizable LGBTQ+ community contributes to the perception of Plainfield as a source of gay life and gay community in the suburbs of New Jersey.

Plainfield has one of the highest percentage of same-sex householders in the state of New Jersey. The First Unitarian Society of Plainfield, the oldest such congregation in the United States, is certified as LGBTQ welcoming.

In 1986, The New York Times reported on what was termed at the time as the "growing homosexual population in Plainfield" drawn to the stock of aging Victorian, Tudor and colonial homes, and featured interviews with various gay men who lived in Plainfield and worked in Manhattan.

One of the Queen City's elected leaders, former Councilwoman Rebecca Williams (who now represents all of Union County a county commissioner), is openly lesbian. In 2017, as Council President, Williams organized and hosted the city's first-ever Pride flag-raising during Pride Month.

In 2015, an openly gay Plainfield Republican ran for state Assemblyman.

Plainfield has been home to openly gay former New Jersey governor James McGreevey and his longtime partner, an Australian-American business executive.

Plainfield is also at the center of gay life in Union County, which hosts LGBTQ family events and opened the state's first county-wide office of LGBTQ services in 2018.

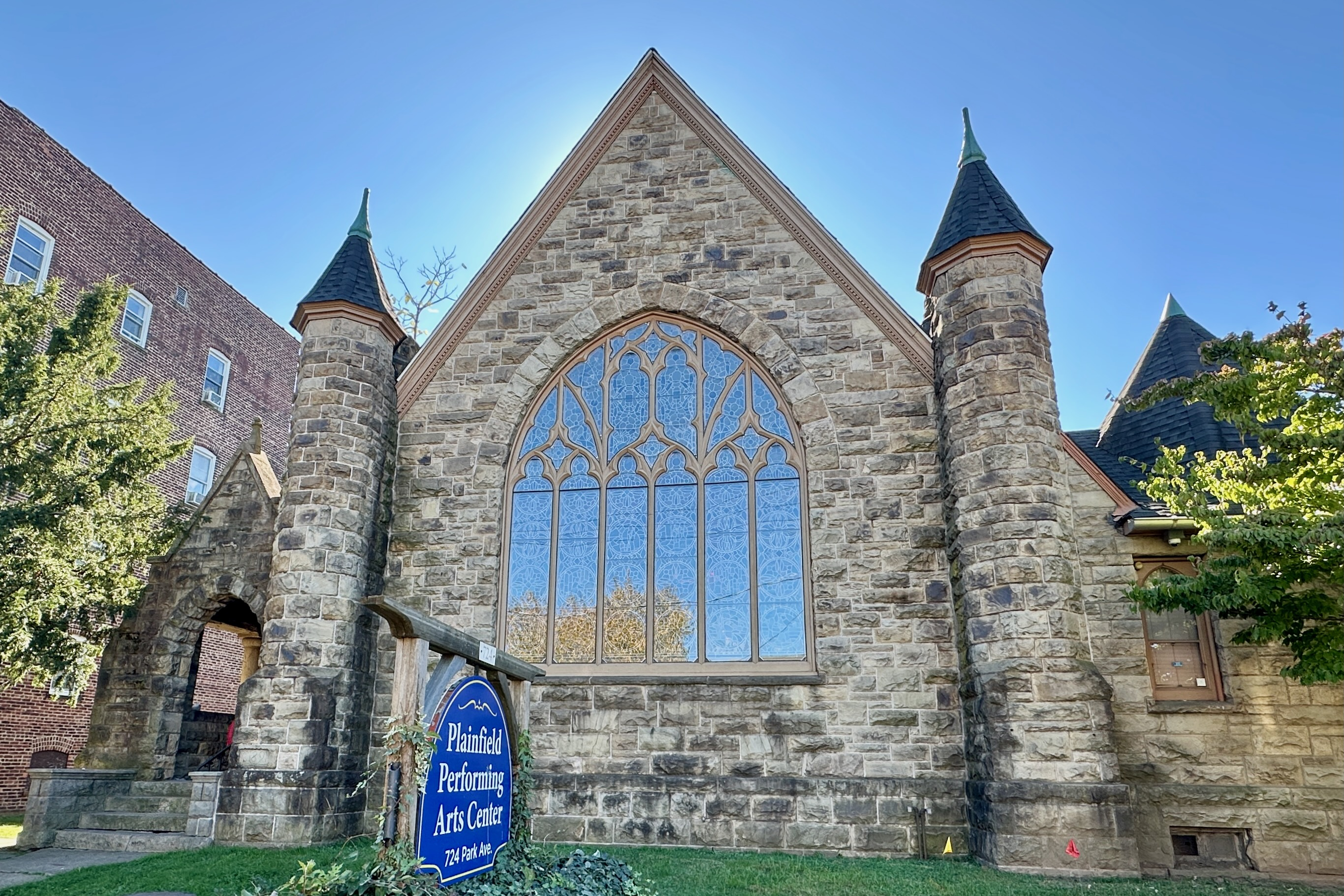
The Plainfield Performing Arts Center, which opened in 2019, is an arts center inside a former church built in 1892. Formerly All Souls Church, it was the home of the LGBT-welcoming First Unitarian Society of Plainfield, which donated the former church to become an arts center and moved its weekly services to a Fanwood church.

Tëmike Park is an LGBTQ+ welcoming space in Cedar Brook Park in Plainfield between Stelle Avenue and Randolph Road. It is named for a Lenape-language expression of welcome.

== Arts and culture ==
- The Queen City Film Festival is held in the city every fall to honor independently produced films by creators from underrepresented communities.
- Plainfield is the birthplace of Bill Evans, the famous jazz piano artist.

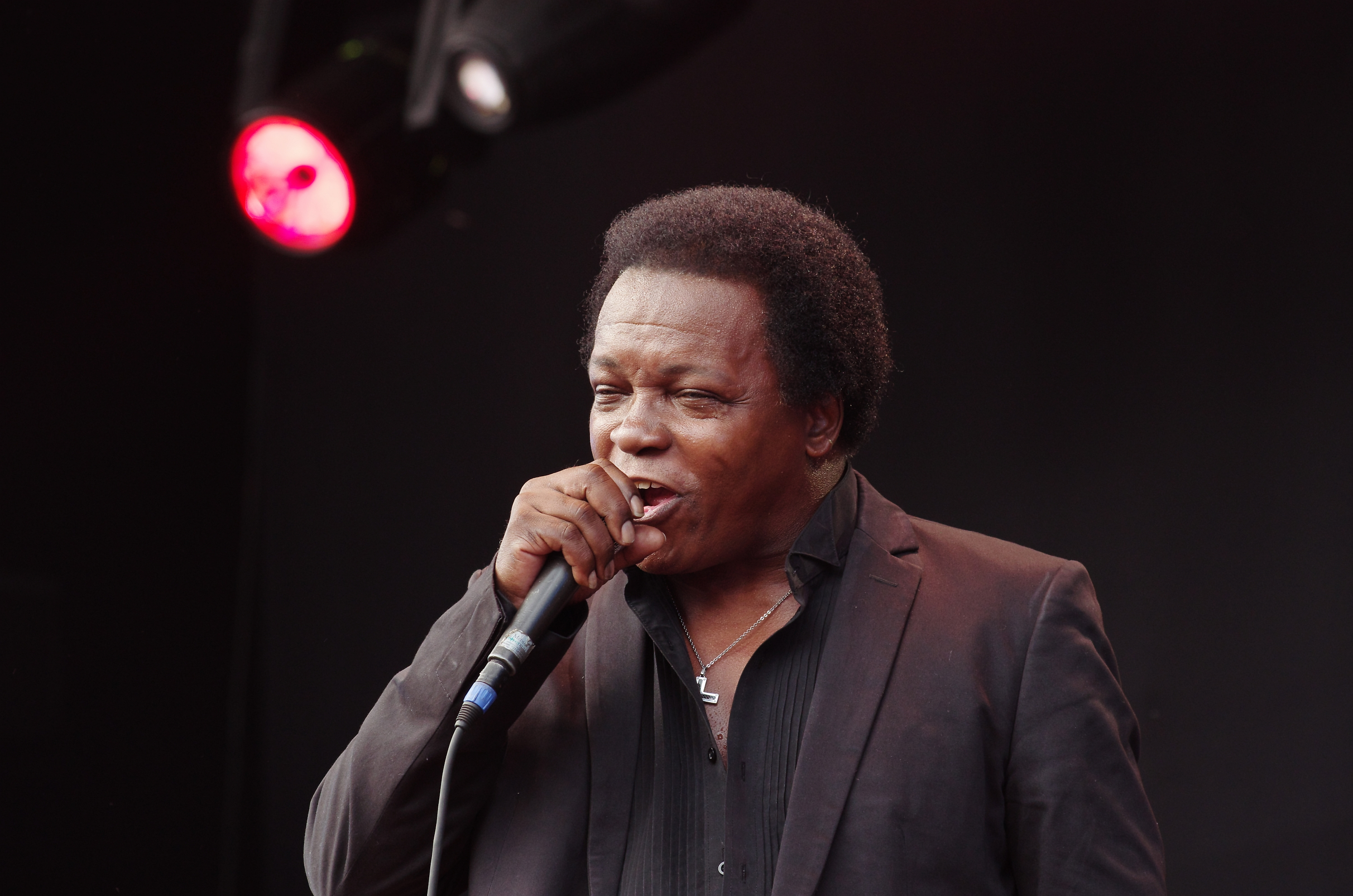
Plainfield's Lee Fields performing with The Expressions at Haldern Pop 2013

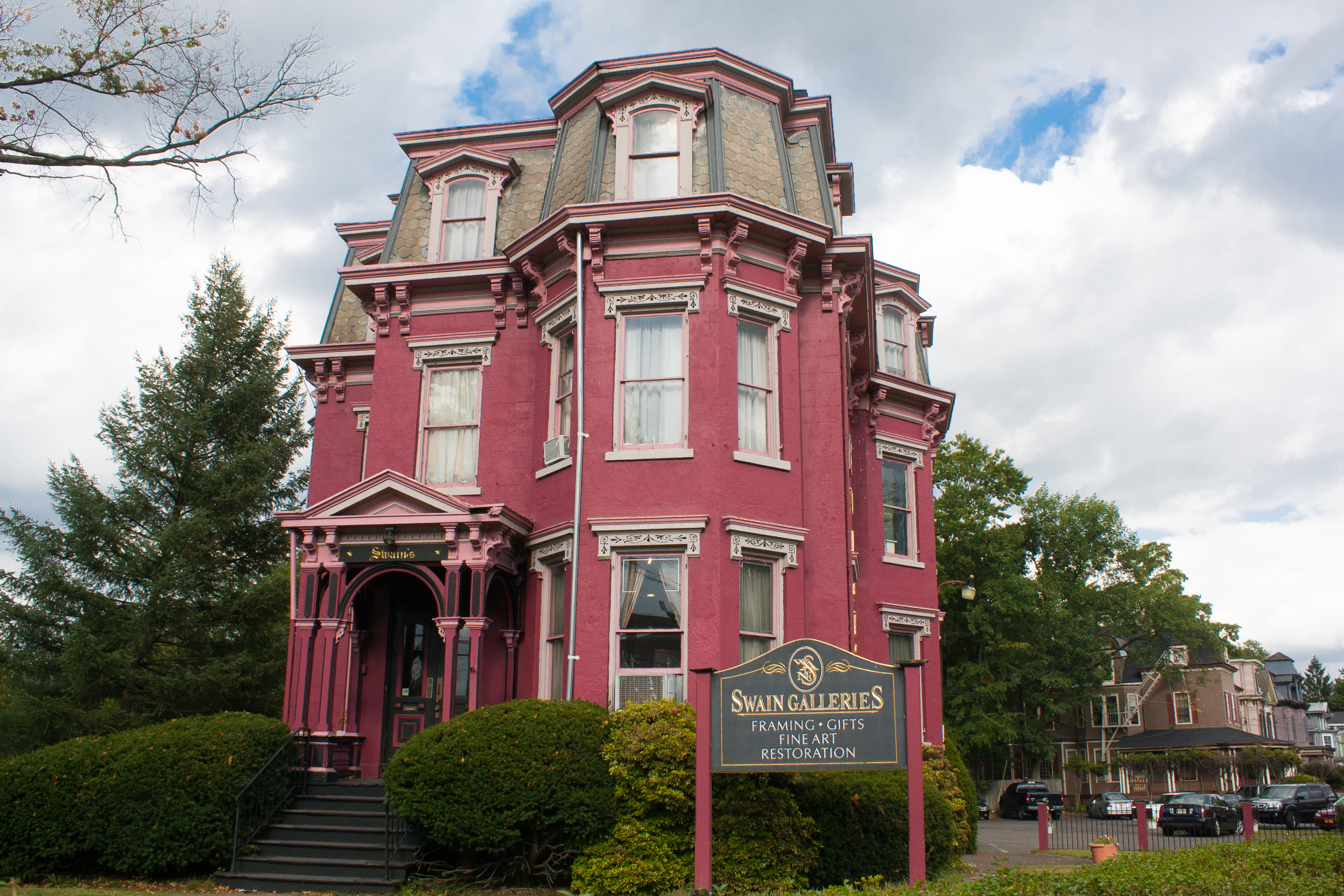
The Swain Galleries in the Crescent Area Historic District

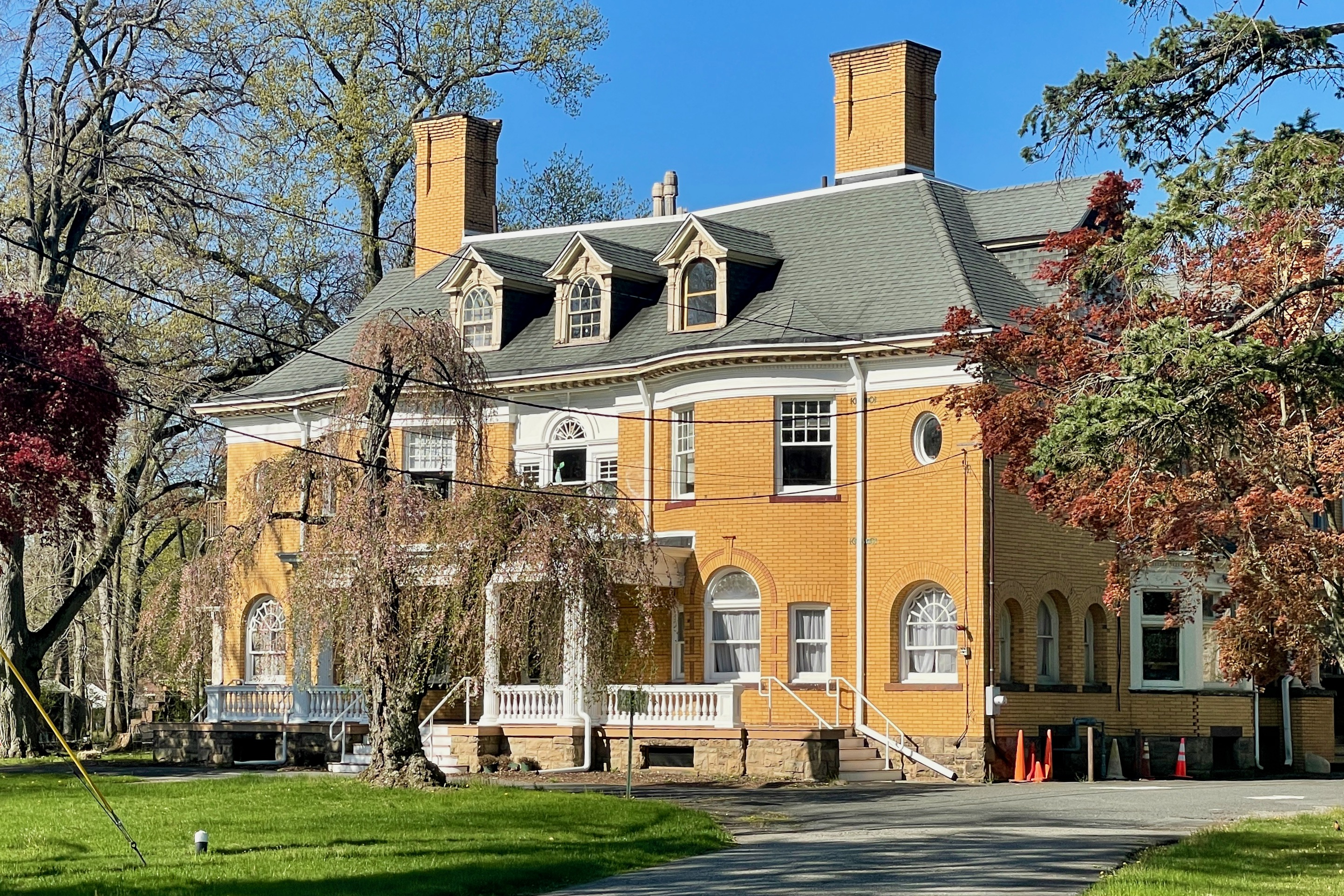
The duCret Art School is the oldest art school in New Jersey

- Plainfield is the birthplace of P-Funk. George Clinton founded The Parliaments while working in a barber shop in Plainfield. Parliament-Funkadelic was inducted in the Rock and Roll Hall of Fame in 1997.
- Acclaimed soul singer Lee Fields resides with his family in Plainfield and moved to the city as a teen in the 1960s.
- The Plainfield Symphony performs concerts at Crescent Avenue Presbyterian Church. The orchestra was founded in 1919, making it one of the oldest continuously operating orchestras in the United States.
- 1990s R&B girl group Total, of Bad Boy Records fame, is from Plainfield.

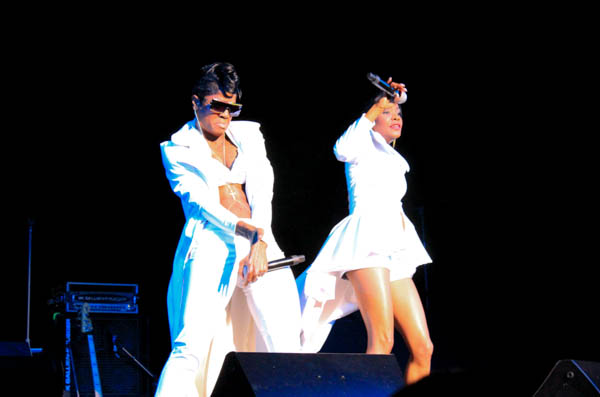
Plainfield's Total performing at Legends of Bad Boy in 2014

- In October 2010, former Plainfield music teacher and American Idol alum Anwar Robinson and performer Yolanda Adams joined with community residents to try to be recognized by Guinness World Records for assembling the world's largest gospel chorus.
- The duCret School of Art was founded in 1926, making it the oldest art school in New Jersey. Founded by Marjorie Van Emburgh Chargois as the Van Emburgh School of Art, it was purchased in the 1960s by Dudley duCret. In 1970, it moved to its current home in the George Strong mansion on Central Avenue in the Van Wyck neighborhood. A 1933 exhibition of nudes by the school's artists once led to a controversy, according to The New York Times. Plainfield native Onyx Keesha, prior to her relocation to Atlanta, and members of the arts collective and production team M. PoWeR Arts have offered classes in filmmaking, acting, dance, writing and theater to Plainfield citizens at the duCret School of Art.
- The Swain Galleries were founded in 1868. The entity is the oldest privately owned art gallery in the state. The galleries are located in a Victorian structure in the Crescent Historic District of Plainfield
- Music in the Park is an annual summertime community concert event featuring the Plainfield Idol competition.
- The Parish Hall Theater at the Plainfield Cultural Center is a proscenium theater that seats approximately 125 people. Available for theatrical productions and musical performances, it features theatrical lighting, a spot light, separate lighting booth, an upright piano and a sound system.
- The historic Sanctuary at the Plainfield Cultural Center offers prime acoustics for recordings by bands and vocalists. The Sanctuary seats approximately 140 people. It is available for rehearsals, concerts, recording sessions, spoken word events, recitals and meetings.
- The Plainfield Music Store was founded in 1951 and offers a vast archive of sheet music.
- The French School of Music offers music lessons and was founded in 1927 by Yvonne Comme, a pupil of Gabriel Fauré who performed for Debussy.
- Begun in 1980, the annual Crescent Concerts series at Crescent Avenue Presbyterian Church brings high-end vocal, instrumental, choral and orchestral music performances to the residents of the City of Plainfield and surrounding areas.
- The Queen City October Music Festival is an annual music festival that is spearheaded by the Plainfield Arts Council.
- The Shiloh Baptist Church, which has been worshiping together as a Plainfield community of faith since 1908, hosts Jazz In The Sanctuary as part of the Queen City October Music Festival as well as its Jazz for Jesus program.
- DreamHouse Theater Company is a theater company operated in partnership with the First Unitarian Society of Plainfield (FUSP). DreamHouse performs one-act and original plays, readings, spoken word and musical offerings.
- In the teaser trailer for the film, A Good Day to Die Hard, John McClane remarks "the 007 of Plainfield, New Jersey" thus confirming this as his fictional birthplace.
- J.M. Benjamin is a Plainfield author and filmmaker whose short film, Moves We Make, was filmed in Plainfield and won the Paul Robeson Award at the Newark Black Film Festival.

== Media ==
=== Media outlets ===
Plainfield media includes:

- TAPinto Plainfield is an online news site devoted to Plainfield.
- Union News Daily. A news outlet covering Union County news, it has a dedicated Plainfield section. It is part of LocalSource and published by Worrall Community Newspapers of Union.
- PCTV. Plainfield also has its own channel, Plainfield Community Television (PCTV), which is available to Comcast and Verizon FiOS television subscribers on Comcast Cable Channel 96/Verizon FIOS Channel 34.

Remaining multi-community newspapers include the Courier News, a daily newspaper based in Bridgewater Township, and The Star-Ledger based in Newark. The Courier News is a consolidation of The Evening News (founded in 1884), the Plainfield Daily Press (founded in 1887) and the Plainfield Courier (founded in 1891). The paper was based in the city and called the Plainfield Courier News until 1972, when it moved westward to Bridgewater.

=== Other Plainfield coverage ===
Local civic reporting includes:

- And My Point Is: A Progressive Vision for Union County is a countywide civic blog written by elected Union County Commissioner Rebecca Williams, Plainfield resident and English professor at Essex County College.
- Cory Storch for Good Government is a local civic blog focused on good government, written by Ward 2 Councilman Cory Storch, CEO of Bridgeway Rehabilitation Services, a not-for-profit mental health service organization.
- Plainfield View is another hyperlocal blog, published by David Marcus Rutherford.
- Plainfield Vision is a blog dedicated to improving Plainfield, written by Plainfield Democratic City Committee member Sean McKenna.
- Queen City Pride is a local news and events blog.

=== Defunct media ===
As of 2017, local media in New Jersey has undergone dramatic shrinkage.

C L I P S was a daily online news round-up dedicated to local Plainfield news by the late Dan Damon, former City of Plainfield information officer, who passed in 2020. "Begun in 2003 as an email newsletter to Plainfield city council members. it was later offered to the general public by email and had been available as a blog since 2007." Plainfield Today was a city opinion blog also published by Damon.

Plainfield Plaintalker (2005–2010) and Plaintalker II (2010–2017) were two local blogs published by longtime local reporter Bernice Paglia.

From 1961 to 1997, Plainfield was home to WERA at 1590 on the AM dial with studios at 120 West 7th Street.

== Places of worship ==
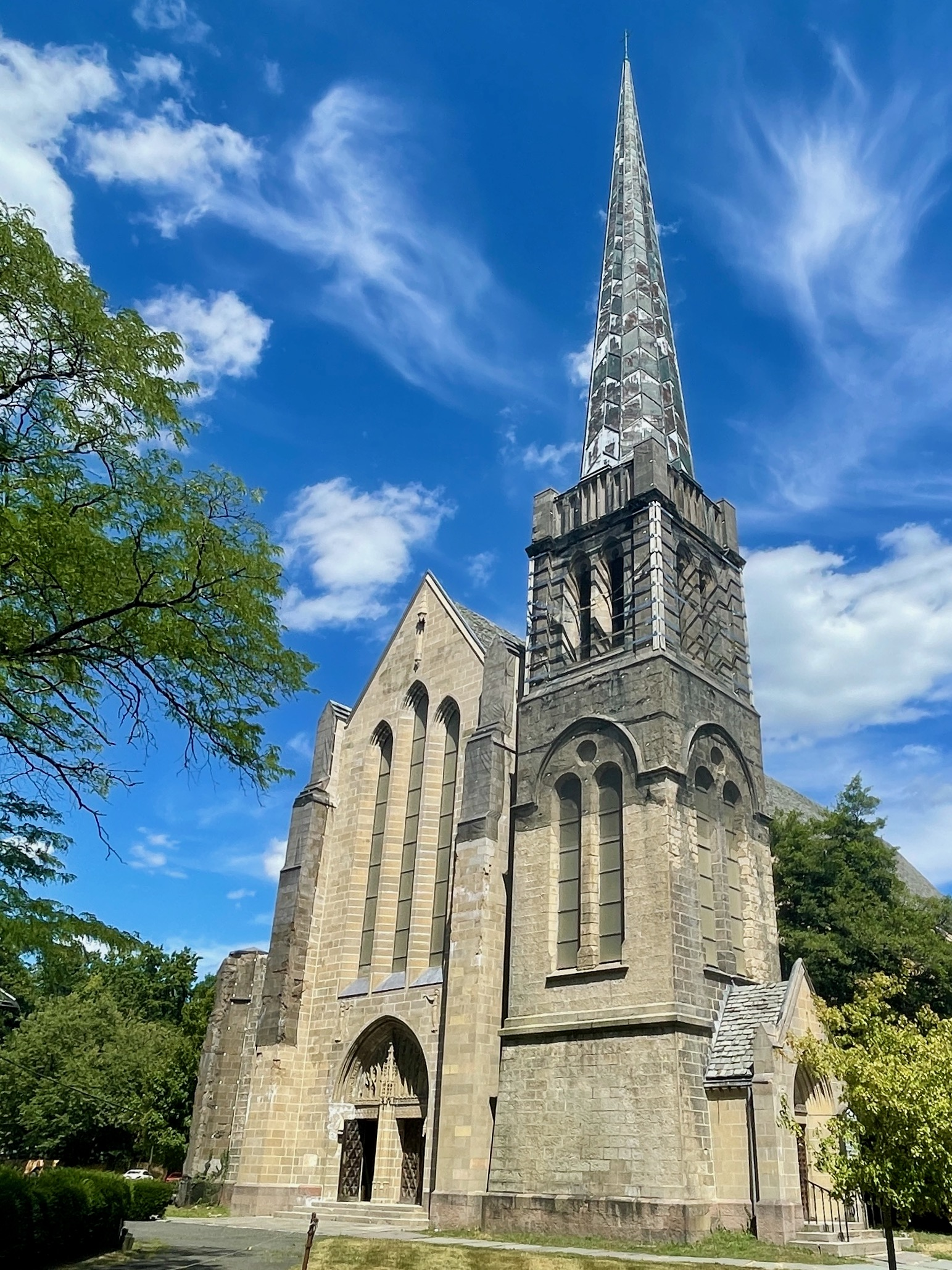
Crescent Avenue Presbyterian Church in the Crescent Area Historic District

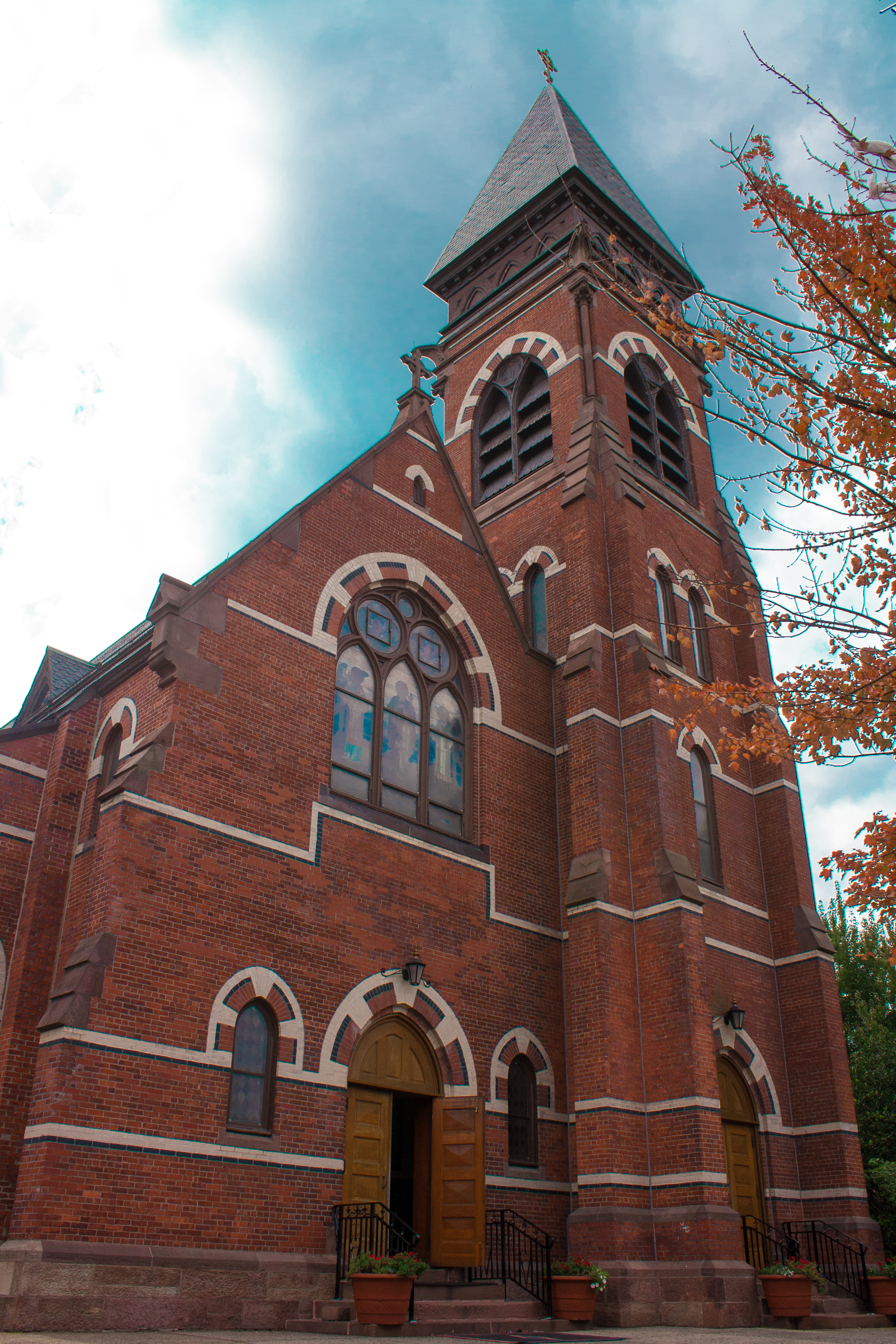
Saint Mary's Catholic Church is a heavily Spanish-speaking parish in Plainfield.

Houses of worship include:

- Saint Mary's Catholic Church. Built in the 1870s in what was then a heavily Irish neighborhood by Irish-born architect Jeremiah O'Rourke it is now a heavily Spanish-speaking parish, part of the Archdiocese of Newark.
- Grace Church. Founded in 1852, and registered a national historic site, Grace Church is an example of late 19th-century Gothic Revival architecture. A very active parish, with a large community outreach program (After-School care, Community Garden, E.S.L., Soup Kitchen, 12-Step Programs, a Robust Music Program, Zumba, etc).
- First Park Baptist.
- Albaseerah Islamic Center is a mosque in the Sleepy Hollow district.
- First Unitarian Society of Plainfield was founded in the 1880s. It is the oldest Unitarian congregation in the country. All Souls Church, which hosts First Unitarian was completed in the early 1890s. Magician and architect Oscar Teale designed the church in 1892. With a history of involvement in the LGBTQ community and support for Black Lives Matter, it is certified as a Unitarian Universalist LGBTQ Welcoming Congregation.
- Bethel Presbyterian Church
- Crescent Avenue Presbyterian Church. A Gilbert F. Adams organ undergirds the church's musical programming.
- The Mt. Olive Baptist Church.
- Plainfield Friends Quaker Meeting House.
- Seventh Day Baptist Church
- St. Bernard of Clairvaux & St. Stanislaus Kostka.
- Shiloh Baptist Church, established 1908.
- The United Presbyterian Church 1825.
- New Covenant Church, Pentecostal.
- Cross of Life Lutheran Church (ELCA)
- Ruth Fellowship Ministries - Rev. Tracey L Brown - Founder/Pastor

== Parks and recreation ==
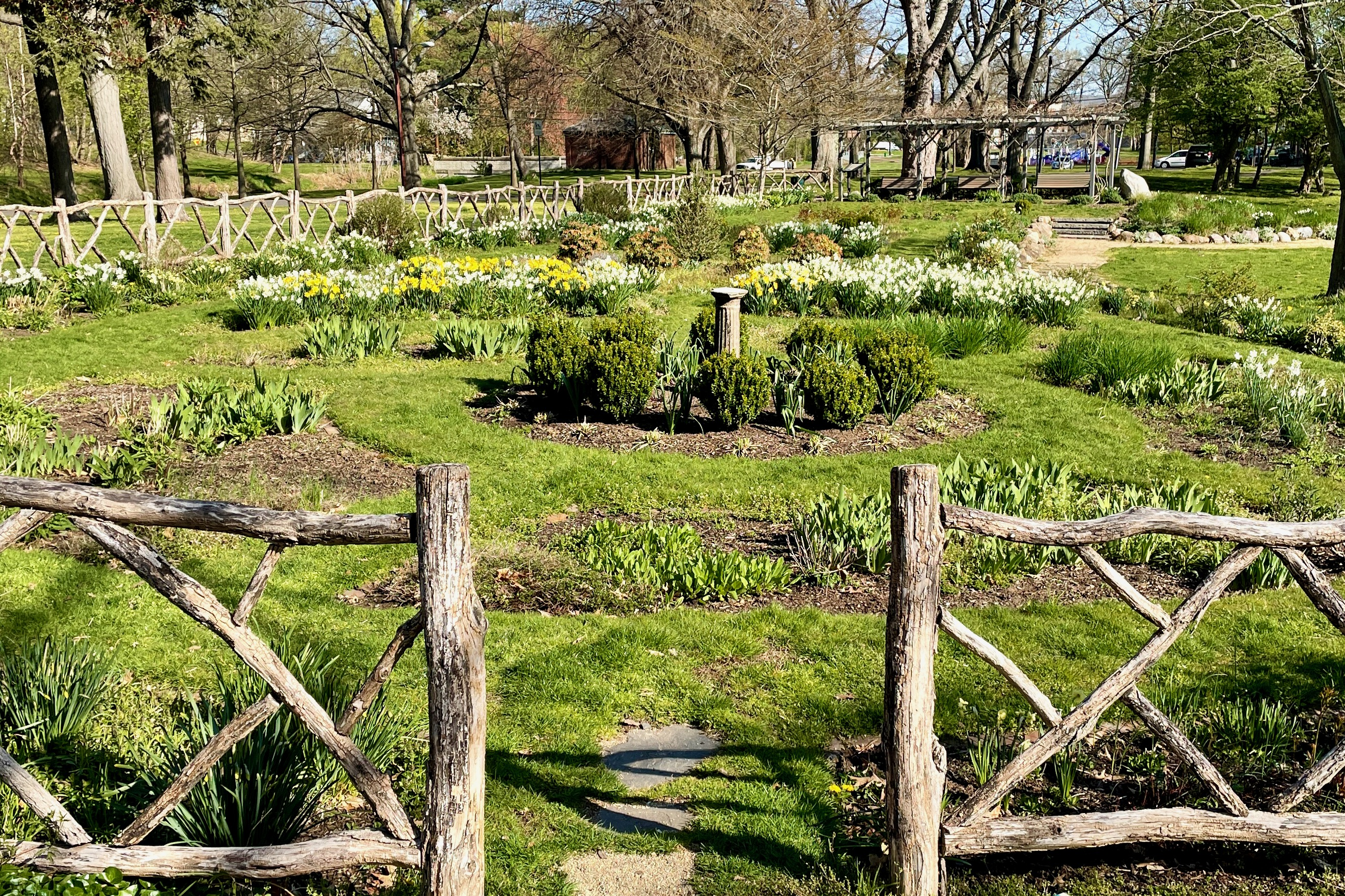
Shakespeare Garden in Cedar Brook Park.

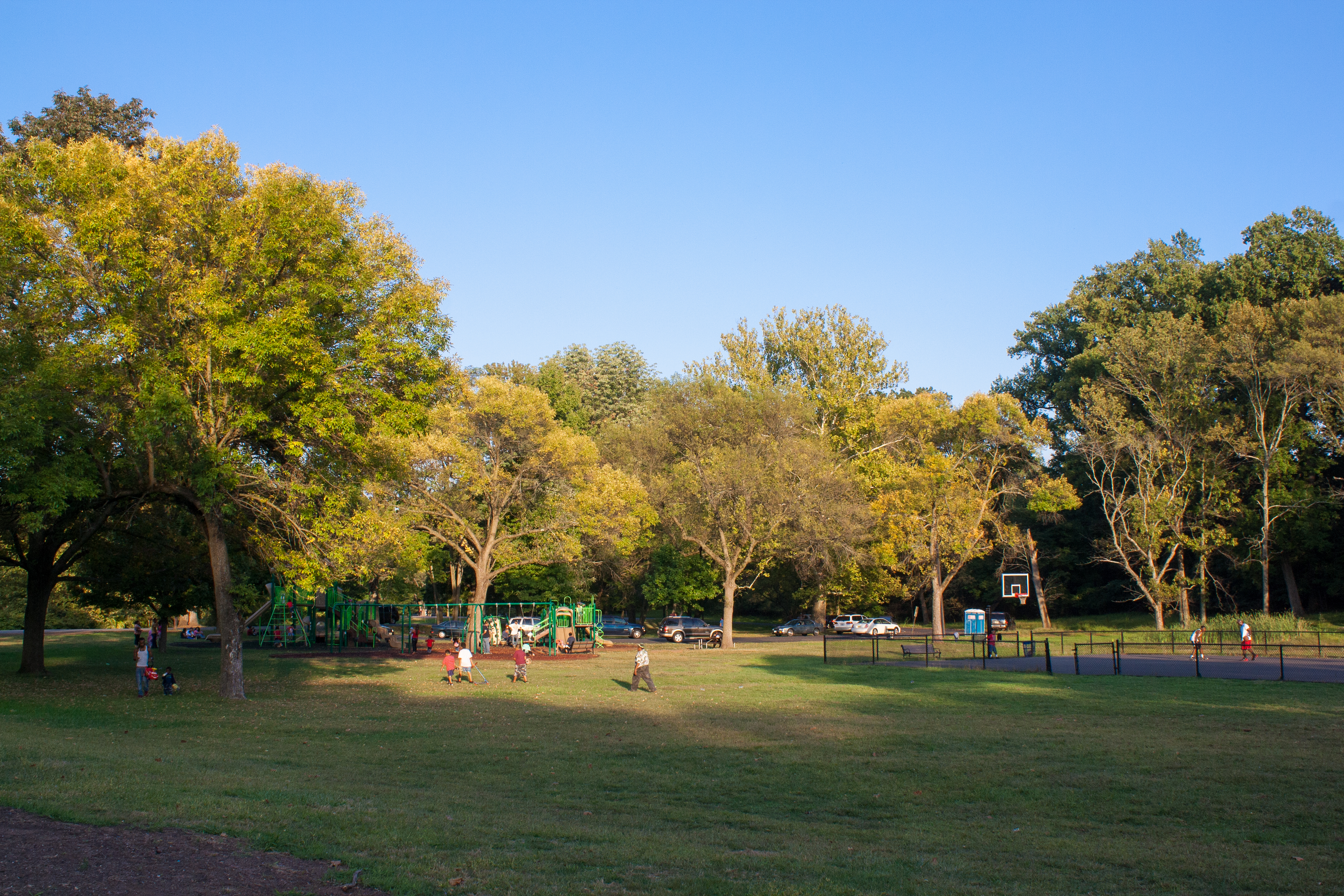
Green Brook Park Playground; Plainfield, New Jersey

- Tëmike Park opened in June 2022 as an inclusive LGBTQ+ space and playground located at the northern end of Cedar Brook Park in Plainfield.
- Cedar Brook Park lies on the west side of the city.
- Green Brook Park offers hiking, sports, and picnicking in the West End.
- The Plainfield Garden Club was founded in 1915. It has maintained the Shakespeare Garden in Cedar Brook Park since the garden's inception in 1927. Designed by the Olmsted Brothers firm, it is one of only 23 Shakespeare Gardens in the US. It is on the National Register of Historic Places and is a part of the state's Women's Heritage trail.
- The hiking trails of the Watchung Reservation are located close to the city boundaries.
- Plainfield Skatepark at Madison Park offers skateboarding and other wheeled activity. In 2017, this state-of-the-art public skateboarding area opened inside Madison Park. It is the first public skatepark in the city. Its modern California-style design was deemed by some skateboarders as a first in New Jersey.
- Milt Campbell Field in the East End, named for Plainfield legend and Olympic gold medalist Milt Campbell offers sports and nature walks.
- Hannah Atkins Center Pool, Rushmore Playground Pool, and Seidler Field Pool offer swimming, sports and other recreation.

== Government ==
=== Local government ===
Plainfield is governed under a special charter granted by the New Jersey Legislature. The city is one of 11 (of the 564) municipalities statewide governed under a special charter. The governing body is comprised of a mayor and a seven-member city council, all of whom serve four-year terms in office. The city is divided into four wards, with one ward seat up for election each year. There are three at-large seats: one from the First and Fourth Wards; one from the Second and Third Wards; and one from the city as a whole. The three at-large seats and mayoral seat operate in a four-year cycle, with one seat up for election each year.

As of 2026, the Mayor of the City of Plainfield is Democrat Adrian O. Mapp, whose term of office ends December 31, 2029. Members of the Plainfield City Council are Council President Julienne Cherry (At Large Wards 1 and 4; D, 2027), Council Vice President Steve G. Hockaday (At Large All Wards; D, 2028), Terri Briggs-Jones (Ward 4; D, 2029), Robert K. Graham (Ward 1; D, 2026), Charles McRae (Ward 3; D, 2028), Darcella Sessomes (Ward 2; D, 2027) and Richard Wyatt (At Large Wards 2 and 3; D, 2026).

=== Federal, state, and county representation ===
Plainfield is located in the 12th Congressional District and is part of New Jersey's 22nd state legislative district.

For the 119th United States Congress, New Jersey's 12th congressional district is represented by Bonnie Watson Coleman (D, Ewing Township). New Jersey is represented in the United States Senate by Democrats Cory Booker (Newark, term ends 2027) and Andy Kim (Moorestown, term ends 2031).

For the 2026–2027 session, the 22nd legislative district of the New Jersey Legislature is represented in the State Senate by Nicholas Scutari (D, Linden) and in the General Assembly by Linda S. Carter (D, Plainfield) and James J. Kennedy (D, Rahway).

Union County is governed by a Board of County Commissioners, whose nine members are elected at-large to three-year terms of office on a staggered basis with three seats coming up for election each year, with an appointed County Manager overseeing the day-to-day operations of the county. At an annual reorganization meeting held in the beginning of January, the board selects a Chair and Vice Chair from among its members. As of 2026, Union County's County Commissioners are:

Vice Chair Rebecca Williams (D, Plainfield, 2028), Chairman Joesph Bodek (D, Linden, 2026), James E. Baker Jr. (D, Rahway, 2027), Michele Delisfort (D, Union Township, 2026), Lourdes M. Leon (D, Elizabeth, 2026), Alexander Mirabella (D, Fanwood, 2027) Kimberly Palmieri-Mouded (D, Westfield, 2027). Stanley J. Neron (D, Elizabeth, 2028), Joseph Signorello III (D, Roselle Park, 2028)

Constitutional officers elected on a countywide basis are: Clerk Vacant - Incumbent Clerk Joanne Rajoppi (D, Union Township) died on July 16, 2026. Her death triggered a special election for a full five-year term to be held concurrently with the November 2026 general election. Deputy Clerk Clara Fernández assumes the powers of the office until the vacancy is filled. Sheriff Peter Corvelli (D, Kenilworth, 2026) and Surrogate Christopher E. Hudak (D, Clark, 2027).

=== Politics ===
As of March 2011, there were a total of 20,722 registered voters in Plainfield, of which 12,078 (58.3% vs. 41.8% countywide) were registered as Democrats, 947 (4.6% vs. 15.3%) were registered as Republicans and 7,693 (37.1% vs. 42.9%) were registered as Unaffiliated. There were 4 voters registered to other parties. Among the city's 2010 Census population, 41.6% (vs. 53.3% in Union County) were registered to vote, including 56.1% of those ages 18 and over (vs. 70.6% countywide).

Gubernatorial election results for Plainfield
Year	Republican		Democratic		Third party(ies)	
Year	No.	%	No.	%	No.	%
2025	1,075	9.66%	9,951	89.44%	100	0.90%
2021	805	10.33%	6,929	88.88%	62	0.80%
2017	831	10.37%	6,992	87.27%	189	2.36%
2013	1,723	22.72%	5,757	75.91%	104	1.37%
2009	1,057	12.17%	7,140	82.19%	490	5.64%
2005	1,153	13.30%	7,080	81.64%	439	5.06%

In the 2012 presidential election, Democrat Barack Obama received 14,640 votes (93.3% vs. 66.0% countywide), ahead of Republican Mitt Romney with 909 votes (5.8% vs. 32.3%) and other candidates with 46 votes (0.3% vs. 0.8%), among the 15,683 ballots cast by the city's 22,555 registered voters, for a turnout of 69.5% (vs. 68.8% in Union County). In the 2008 presidential election, Democrat Barack Obama received 15,280 votes (92.3% vs. 63.1% countywide), ahead of Republican John McCain with 1,110 votes (6.7% vs. 35.2%) and other candidates with 56 votes (0.3% vs. 0.9%), among the 16,548 ballots cast by the city's 22,516 registered voters, for a turnout of 73.5% (vs. 74.7% in Union County). In the 2004 presidential election, Democrat John Kerry received 11,508 votes (85.4% vs. 58.3% countywide), ahead of Republican George W. Bush with 1,773 votes (13.2% vs. 40.3%) and other candidates with 88 votes (0.7% vs. 0.7%), among the 13,480 ballots cast by the city's 20,445 registered voters, for a turnout of 65.9% (vs. 72.3% in the whole county).

United States presidential election results for Planfield
Year	Republican		Democratic		Third party(ies)	
Year	No.	%	No.	%	No.	%
2024	2,540	17.39%	11,834	81.03%	231	1.58%
2020	1,532	9.70%	14,160	89.67%	100	0.63%
2016	1,124	7.55%	13,500	90.62%	273	1.83%
2012	909	5.90%	14,460	93.80%	46	0.30%
2008	1,110	6.75%	15,280	92.91%	56	0.34%
2004	1,773	13.26%	11,508	86.08%	88	0.66%

In the 2017 gubernatorial election, Democrat Phil Murphy received 6,992 votes (89.5% vs. 65.2% countywide), ahead of Republican Kim Guadagno with 631 votes (8.1% vs. 32.6%), and other candidates with 189 votes (2.4% vs. 2.1%), among the 8,183 ballots cast by the city's 22,852 registered voters, for a turnout of 35.8%. In the 2013 gubernatorial election, Democrat Barbara Buono received 75.9% of the vote (5,757 cast), ahead of Republican Chris Christie with 22.7% (1,723 votes), and other candidates with 1.4% (104 votes), among the 8,174 ballots cast by the city's 21,996 registered voters (590 ballots were spoiled), for a turnout of 37.2%. In the 2009 gubernatorial election, Democrat Jon Corzine received 7,140 ballots cast (81.3% vs. 50.6% countywide), ahead of Republican Chris Christie with 1,057 votes (12.0% vs. 41.7%), Independent Chris Daggett with 355 votes (4.0% vs. 5.9%) and other candidates with 84 votes (1.0% vs. 0.8%), among the 8,786 ballots cast by the city's 21,738 registered voters, yielding a 40.4% turnout (vs. 46.5% in the county).

United States Senate election results for Plainfield1
Year	Republican		Democratic		Third party(ies)	
Year	No.	%	No.	%	No.	%
2024	1,963	14.93%	10,801	82.14%	386	2.94%
2018	915	8.13%	9,709	86.29%	627	5.57%
2012	832	6.04%	12,824	93.06%	124	0.90%
2006	1,029	13.78%	6,281	84.08%	160	2.14%

United States Senate election results for Plainfield2
Year	Republican		Democratic		Third party(ies)	
Year	No.	%	No.	%	No.	%
2020	1,258	8.06%	14,090	90.33%	251	1.61%
2014	503	6.48%	7,178	92.51%	78	1.01%
2013	407	6.19%	6,131	93.30%	33	0.50%
2008	1,239	8.98%	12,324	89.32%	235	1.70%

== Education ==
=== Public schools ===
The Plainfield Public School District serves students in kindergarten through twelfth grade. The district is one of 31 former Abbott districts statewide that were established pursuant to the decision by the New Jersey Supreme Court in Abbott v. Burke which are now referred to as "SDA Districts" based on the requirement for the state to cover all costs for school building and renovation projects in these districts under the supervision of the New Jersey Schools Development Authority.

As of the 2022–23 school year, the district, comprised of 14 schools, had an enrollment of 10,097 students and 628.7 classroom teachers (on an FTE basis), for a student–teacher ratio of 16.1:1. Schools in the district (with 2022–23 enrollment data from the National Center for Education Statistics) are DeWitt D. Barlow Elementary School (417 students; in grades K–5), Charles and Anna Booker Elementary School (NA; PreK–5), Cedarbrook K-8 Center (623; K–8), Clinton Elementary School (413; K–5), Frederic W. Cook Elementary School (389; K–5), Emerson Community School (509; K–5), Evergreen Elementary School (602; K–5), Jefferson Elementary School (441; K–5), Charles H. Stillman Elementary School (354; K–5), Washington Community School (649; K–5), Frank J. Hubbard Middle School (775; 6–8), Maxson Middle School (818; 6–8), Pinnacle Academy High School (90; 9–12), Plainfield Academy for the Arts and Advanced Studies (356; 7–12) and Plainfield High School (1,925; 9–12).

The district's main high school was the 318th-ranked public high school in New Jersey out of 339 schools statewide in New Jersey Monthly magazine's September 2014 cover story on the state's "Top Public High Schools", using a new ranking methodology. The school had been ranked 280th in the state of 328 schools in 2012, after being ranked 307th in 2010 out of 322 schools listed. The school was removed in 2009 from the list of persistently dangerous schools in New Jersey.

Plainfield is also home to New Jersey's first high school focused on sustainability, the Barack Obama Green Charter High School.

=== Private schools ===
Established in 1984, Koinonia Academy moved to Plainfield in 1997, where it serves students in Pre-K through twelfth grades and operates under the auspices of the Roman Catholic Archdiocese of Newark.

=== Higher education ===
Union College, a community college headquartered in nearby Cranford, maintains a campus in downtown Plainfield.

== Infrastructure ==
=== Transportation ===
==== Roads and highways ====
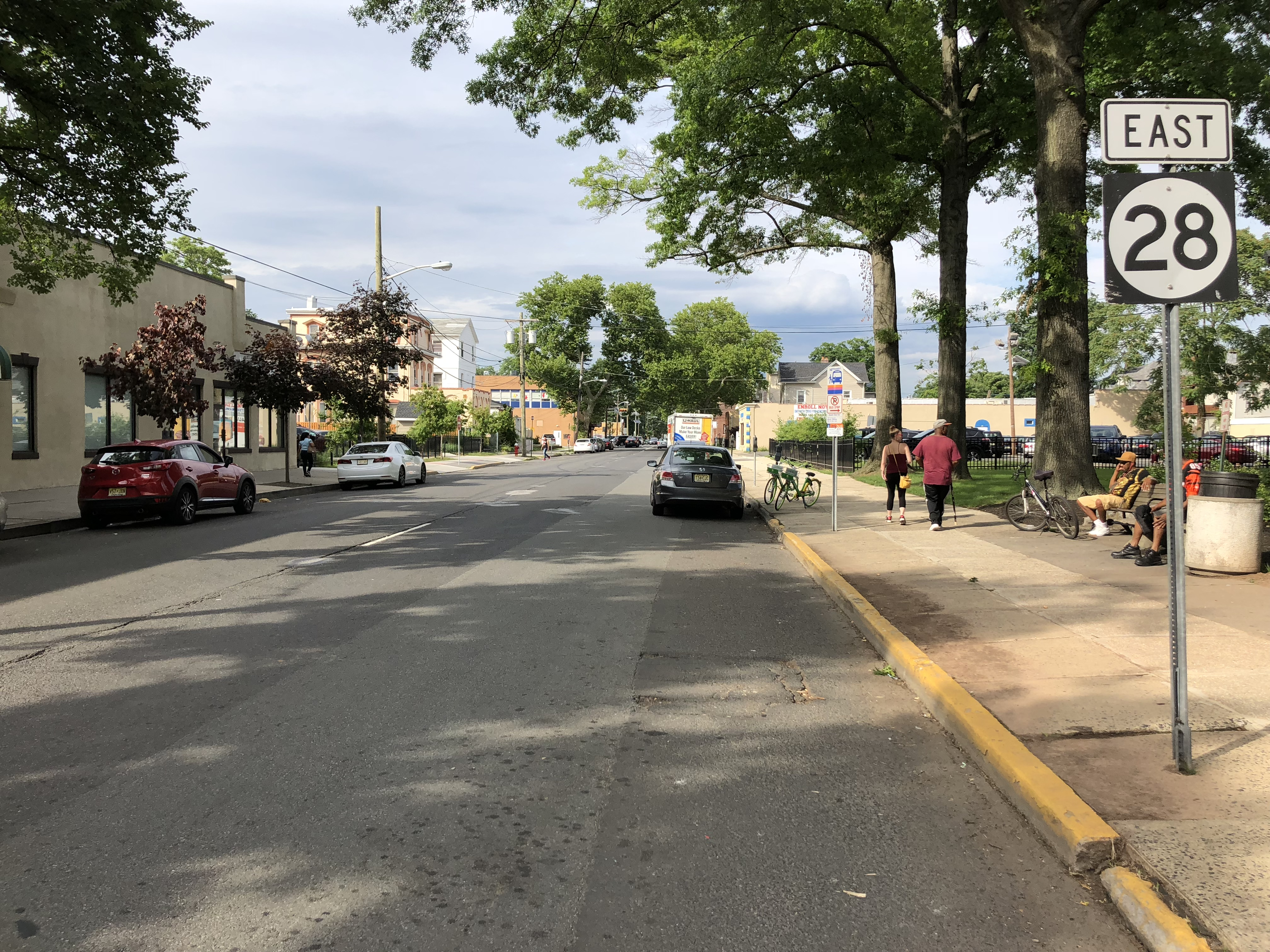
Route 28 through Plainfield

As of May 2010, the city had a total of 101.79 miles (163.82 km) of roadways, of which 87.58 miles (140.95 km) were maintained by the municipality, 14.21 miles (22.87 km) by Union County.

Plainfield is one of the few large suburban cities in central New Jersey to have no federal highway within it. The only major thoroughfare through Plainfield is Route 28, connecting Somerville with Elizabeth and New Jersey Route 27. U.S. Route 22, a mecca for highway shopping and dining, is accessible from Plainfield through North Plainfield, Dunellen and Fanwood. In the early 1960s, Interstate highways were completed near, but not through Plainfield. Interstate 287 is accessible through South Plainfield and Piscataway, while Interstate 78 is accessible through Watchung / Warren Township and neighboring communities. The busiest connecting thoroughfares are Park Avenue (north-south), traversing from U.S. 22 to and into South Plainfield and Edison; Front Street (east-west), connecting Scotch Plains with Dunellen; South Avenue and 7th Street, both of which parallel Front Street, connecting Scotch Plains/Fanwood with Piscataway, South Plainfield and the Middlesex County border.

==== Public transportation ====
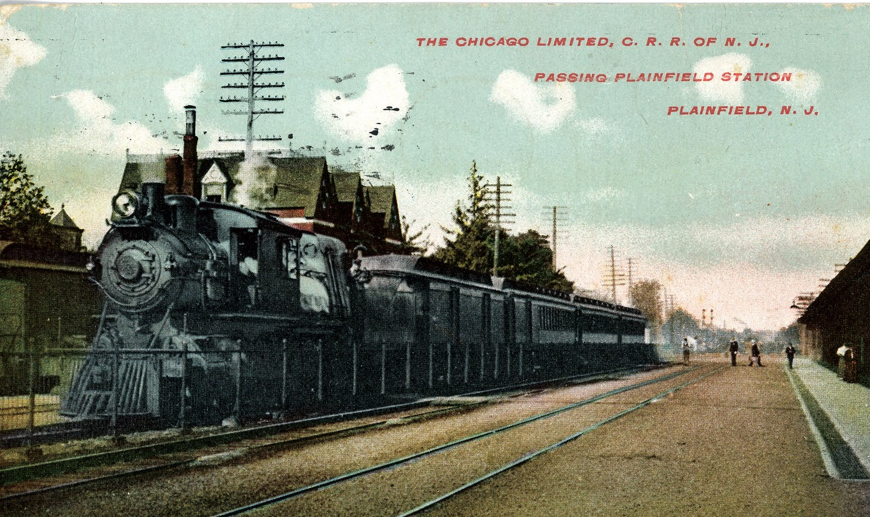
Plainfield Station, c. 1910

Plainfield has two NJ Transit rail stations on the Raritan Valley Line, formerly the mainline of the Central Railroad of New Jersey. The main Plainfield station is in the downtown and a second, smaller Netherwood station is in the Netherwood section, east of downtown and within a mile of the Fanwood border. A third station, located in the west end of town, was closed long ago. The New Brunswick train station is approximately 15 minutes away. The Central Railroad of New Jersey first offered service to Plainfield in 1839. At the height of popularity, the Plainfield "Jersey Central" train station, with its main station building constructed in 1902, was a hub for commuting to Newark and New York. (The Central Railroad of New Jersey terminal was in Jersey City, where ferries would take the rail passengers to New York City.) The station was located near the main post office and downtown stores. The station was serviced by the now defunct Railway Express postal carrier company.

NJ Transit provides bus service on the 113 and 114 to and from the Port Authority Bus Terminal in Midtown Manhattan; the 59, 65 and 66 (limited) to Newark; and local service on the 819 and 822 routes.

In years past, Plainfield was serviced by the Somerset Bus Company with service from Union County to Essex and New York City, the Public Service Bus Company with similar service and Plainfield Transit, providing local service.

Newark Liberty International Airport is approximately 30 minutes away. A proposed PATH train extension to Plainfield in the 1970s, with stops at the airport and at Elizabeth, was canceled in 1976.

=== Health care ===
Solaris Health System, the nonprofit company that owns Muhlenberg Regional Medical Center, asked for permission to close the hospital. This request has been opposed by People's Organization for Progress, an advocacy group based in Newark, New Jersey. The closing has been attributed to the large number of uninsured patients served by the hospital.

Neighborhood Health Services Corporation (NHSC) is a 501(c)(3) nonprofit community health center serving the greater Plainfield and Elizabeth communities. NHSC has been designated a Federally Qualified Health Center (FQHC) by the U.S. Department of Health & Human Service's Bureau of Primary Health. NHSC's 340B Drug Pricing Program, in partnership with Drug Mart Pharmacy of South Plainfield, New Jersey, provides eligible patients access to outpatient drugs at significantly reduced prices.

At the height of popularity in the 1950s through the 1970s, Plainfield was a hub for medical practices. Park Avenue was lined with doctors and medical offices and was nicknamed "Doctors Row".

== Plainfield Teachers College hoax ==
Plainfield Teachers College was a mythical institution created as a hoax by two college football fans in 1941. The phony college's equally nonexistent football team had its scores carried by major newspapers including The New York Times before the hoax was discovered.

== Notable people ==
People who were born in, residents of, or otherwise closely associated with Plainfield include:

- Ernest R. Ackerman (1863–1931), represented New Jersey's 5th congressional district from 1919 to 1931
- John Adams (1772–1863), educator who taught at the Plainfield Academy
- Katherine Langhorne Adams (1885–1977), painter and printmaker
- Erika Amato (born 1969), actress, singer and founder of Velvet Chain
- Donald C. Backer (1943–2010), radio astronomer and professor at University of California, Berkeley who was discoverer of millisecond pulsars and pioneer in pulsar-based searches for gravitational waves
- Rich Bagger (born 1960), former mayor of Westfield, New Jersey
- John Drayton Baker (1915–1942), American Naval aviator who was awarded the Navy Cross for his actions during World War II
- Jeff Barry (born 1938), pop music songwriter, singer and record producer
- Ann Baumgartner (1918–2008), aviator who became the first American woman to fly a United States Army Air Forces jet aircraft when she flew the Bell YP-59A jet fighter as a test pilot during World War II
- James Bell (born 1992), basketball player for Israeli team Hapoel Holon
- G. P. Mellick Belshaw (1928–2020), ninth bishop of the Episcopal Diocese of New Jersey, serving from 1983 to 1994
- Charlie Bicknell (1928–2013), MLB pitcher who played for the Philadelphia Phillies in 1948 and 1949
- Joe Black (1924–2002), professional baseball player for the Brooklyn Dodgers and Cincinnati Reds
- Judy Blume (born 1938), author
- Jon Bramnick (born 1953), member of the New Jersey General Assembly since 2003 who served on the Plainfield City Council from 1984 to 1991
- Anthony Branker (born 1958), jazz musician and educator
- Jack E. Bronston (1922–2017), lawyer and politician who served in the New York Senate from 1959 to 1978
- Van Wyck Brooks (1886–1963), author
- Zoe Brooks (born 2005), college basketball player for the NC State Wolfpack
- Brock Brower (1931–2014), novelist, magazine journalist and TV writer
- Glenwood Brown (born 1967), former professional boxer in the welterweight (147lb) division
- Milt Campbell (1933–2012), 1956 Olympic decathlon gold medalist
- Pete Carmichael (1941–2016), former football coach
- Leonte Carroo (born 1994), wide receiver who played in the NFL for the Miami Dolphins
- Linda S. Carter (born 1963), politician who has represented the 22nd Legislative District since 2018
- Jeremiah E. Cary (1803–1888), member of the U.S. House of Representatives from New York's 21st congressional district
- W. Sterling Cary (1927–2021), president of the National Council of Churches from 1972 to 1975
- James Herbert Case Jr. (1906–1965), 8th president of Washington & Jefferson College
- Diane Chamberlain, author of adult fiction
- DJ Cheese, first world champion of the DMC World DJ Championships, in 1986
- John Chironna (1928–2010), head coach of the Rhode Island Rams football team in 1961 and 1962
- Rohit Chopra (born 1982), member of the Federal Trade Commission
- Earl Clark (born 1988), basketball player for the Los Angeles Lakers, formerly for the University of Louisville Cardinals
- George Clinton (born 1941), founder of Parliament-Funkadelic, childhood home
- Manny Collins (born 1984) American football cornerback
- Richard Guy Condon (1952–1995), anthropologist who specialized in the study of Inuit
- William Consovoy (1974–2023), attorney for conservative causes
- Archibald Cox (1912–2004), Watergate special prosecutor
- Kathy Cox (born 1964), former superintendent of public schools for the U.S. state of Georgia
- Dan Davis (born 1986), defensive lineman who played for the New York Sentinels of the United Football League
- Myles Davis, former college basketball player who played guard for the Xavier Musketeers men's basketball team
- Pat DiNizio (1955–2017), lead singer, songwriter and founding member of the band The Smithereens
- Charles C. Dodge (1841–1910), Union Army brigadier general in the American Civil War and one of the youngest in history, receiving his commission at the age of 21
- Barbara L. Drinkwater (1926–2019), sports physiologist who was the first woman to be president of the American College of Sports Medicine
- William Archibald Dunning (1857–1922), historian best known for his work on the Reconstruction Era
- Justice Dwight, self-taught visual artist
- Devine Eke (born 1996), professional basketball player who has played for ASC Ville de Dakar of the Nationale 1 and the Basketball Africa League
- Bill Evans (1929–1980), jazz pianist
- Alfred A. Farland (1864–1954), classic banjoist
- Dionne Farris (born 1969), singer, songwriter, producer and actress
- Negley Farson (1890–1960), adventurer, journalist and author
- J. Michael Fay (born 1956), conservationist
- Rashan Gary (born 1997), defensive tackle for the Michigan Wolverines football team
- Glenn Goins (1954–1978), singer and guitarist for Parliament-Funkadelic
- Gertrude Joy Grimm (1904–1988), WAVES officer in World War II
- Jan Groover (1943–2012), photographer noted for her use of emerging color photography technologies
- Mark Haines (1946–2011), former host of the CNBC shows Squawk Box and Squawk on the Street
- David Hand (1900–1986), American and British-American animator at Out of the Inkwell studios, Walt Disney Animation Studios, and Gaumont's British Animation Studio
- Bret Harte (1836–1902), author and poet
- Eddie Hazel (1950–1992), lead guitarist and founding member of Parliament-Funkadelic
- William Hazell (1908–1995), president of the New Jersey Institute of Technology
- Elise B. Heinz (1935–2014), lawyer and politician who was a member of the Virginia House of Delegates from 1978 to 1981
- Richard X. Heyman, singer-songwriter and musician, who was a founding member of The Doughboys
- Jon Hilliman (born 1995; class of 2014), professional football player for the New York Giants
- Byron Hurt (born 1969), documentary filmmaker
- Dontae Johnson (born 1991), cornerback who has played in the National Football League for the San Francisco 49ers
- Marion Lee Johnson, African-American mathematician who was crucial to the landing of the Apollo 11 mission
- Tyrone Johnson (born 1992), professional basketball player
- Betty Jones (1930–2019), operatic spinto soprano, who did not begin her career until the age of 41
- Donald Jones (born 1987), former professional wide receiver who played in the NFL with the Buffalo Bills and New England Patriots
- David Kapralik (1925/26–2017), music industry executive, who was an A&R executive, producer and talent manager
- Robyn Kenney (born 1979), field hockey player
- Phyllis Kirk (1927–2006), actress
- Florence LaRue (born 1944), singer and actress best known as an original member of the 5th Dimension
- Geoffrey Lewis (1935–2015), character actor who appeared in more than 100 films and television shows, and was principally known for his film roles alongside Clint Eastwood and Robert Redford
- Peter Liske (born 1942), former professional football player
- Edith Elizabeth Lowry (1897–1970), interdenominational leader in home mission work
- Robert Lowry (1826–1899), Christian preacher and prolific hymn-writer/musician, whose works include "Shall We Gather at the River?"
- Randolph Manning (1804–1864), Michigan Supreme Court justice
- Queena Mario (1896–1951), soprano opera singer, newspaper columnist, voice teacher and fiction writer
- Donald Martino (1931–2005), Pulitzer Prize-winning composer
- Burke Marshall (1922–2003), attorney who served as head of the United States Assistant Attorney General for the Civil Rights Division during the Civil Rights movement
- John Marshall (born 1963), former middle-distance track athlete who specialized in the 800 meters and competed at the 1984 Summer Olympics
- Jack Martin (1887–1980), slick-fielding, weak-hitting infielder in Major League Baseball, playing mainly at shortstop for three different teams between the 1912 and 1914 seasons
- James Edgar Martine (1850–1925), United States Senator from New Jersey
- Robert Mason (born 1942), author of Chickenhawk
- Bridget Mary McCormack (born 1966), lawyer, professor, and judge, serving on the Michigan Supreme Court since 2013, and as Chief Justice since 2019
- Mary McCormack (born 1969), actress
- Will McCormack (born 1974), actor, executive producer, screenwriter and film director, best known for his 2020 short film If Anything Happens I Love You, which was nominated for the Academy Award for Best Animated Short Film
- Peter McDonough (1925–1998), politician who served in both the New Jersey General Assembly and New Jersey Senate
- Jim McGreevey (born 1957), former Governor of New Jersey
- Warren McLaughlin (1876–1923), Major League Baseball pitcher who played for the Philadelphia Phillies and Pittsburgh Pirates
- Eugene Monroe (born 1987), former professional football player
- Dudley Moore (1935–2002), actor who resided there at the time of his death
- Nonnie Moore (1922–2009), fashion editor at Mademoiselle, Harper's Bazaar and GQ"
- Cordell Mosson (1952–2013), vocalist and bassist for Parliament-Funkadelic
- James S. Negley (1826–1901), Civil War General, farmer, railroader, and U.S. Representative from the state of Pennsylvania
- Billy Bass Nelson (born 1951), bassist, founding member of Parliament-Funkadelic
- Gail R. O'Day (1954–2018), biblical scholar
- Andrew P. O'Rourke (1933–2013), former Westchester County Executive
- Montell Owens (born 1984), professional football player for the Jacksonville Jaguars
- Irving Penn (1917–2009), photographer
- Elizabeth Price (born 1996), gymnast
- Kasim Reed (born 1969), birthplace, former Mayor of Atlanta
- Edward Regan (1930–2014), politician who served for 15 years as New York State Comptroller
- Emma Winner Rogers (1855–1922), writer and speaker on economic and social questions, and on the Arts and Crafts movement
- Erik Rosenmeier (born 1965), former NFL center who played for the Buffalo Bills in 1987
- Jane Rule (1931–2007), author of lesbian-themed novels and non-fiction
- William Nelson Runyon (1871–1931), Acting Governor of New Jersey from 1919 to 1920
- Justin Sears (born 1994), basketball player for the Gießen 46ers in Germany
- Robert Shapiro (born 1942), lawyer
- Garry Shider (1953–2010), musical director of P-Funk
- Henry Soles Jr. (1935–2018), minister who served as the senior chaplain for the Chicago Bulls for more than 30 years
- Percy Hamilton Stewart (1867–1951), mayor of Plainfield in 1912 and 1913, represented New Jersey's 5th congressional district from 1931 to 1933
- Bertram D. Tallamy (1901–1989), transportation official who served as Federal Highway Administrator and as superintendent of the New York State Department of Public Works
- Robert W. Tebbs (1875–1945), architectural photographer
- Edward Herbert Thompson (1856–1935), archaeologist and diplomat
- Jeff Torborg (born 1941), former professional baseball player and manager
- Janeen Uzzell, global technology executive who was chief operating officer of the Wikimedia Foundation
- Daniel Tompkins Van Buren (1826–1890), Union Army officer who attained the rank of brigadier general by brevet in the American Civil War
- Nancy Van de Vate (1930–2023), composer
- Fred Van Eps (1878–1960), banjoist and early recording artist
- George Van Eps (1913–1998), swing and mainstream jazz guitarist
- Rich Vos (born 1957), comedian
- Helen Walulik (1929–2012), All-American Girls Professional Baseball League player
- David S. Ware (1949–2012), jazz saxophonist
- Vic Washington (1946–2008), former professional football player
- James West (born 1931), co-inventor of the foil electret microphone and member of the National Inventors Hall of Fame
- Kevin White (born 1992), former NFL wide receiver, Chicago Bears, New Orleans Saints, and San Francisco 49ers
- Harrison A. Williams (1919–2001), U.S. Senator who resigned following the Abscam scandal
- Jay Williams (born 1981), former professional basketball player with the Chicago Bulls
- Malinda Williams (born 1975), actress who played hair stylist Tracy "Bird" Van Adams on the Showtime television drama Soul Food
- Bernie Worrell (1944–2016), keyboardist, founding member of Parliament-Funkadelic, childhood home
- Albert Capwell Wyckoff (1903–1953), ordained minister of the Presbyterian Church (USA) and author of juvenile fiction, most notably the Mercer Boys series and Mystery Hunter series
- James A. Yorke (born 1941), chair of the Mathematics Department at the University of Maryland, College Park
- Olamide Zaccheaus (born 1997), American football wide receiver for the Atlanta Falcons of the National Football League

== See also ==
- Plainfield Riding and Driving Club
- Plainfield Armory
