= North Avenue Commercial District =

- U.S. National Register of Historic Places
- U.S. Historic district
- New Jersey Register of Historic Places
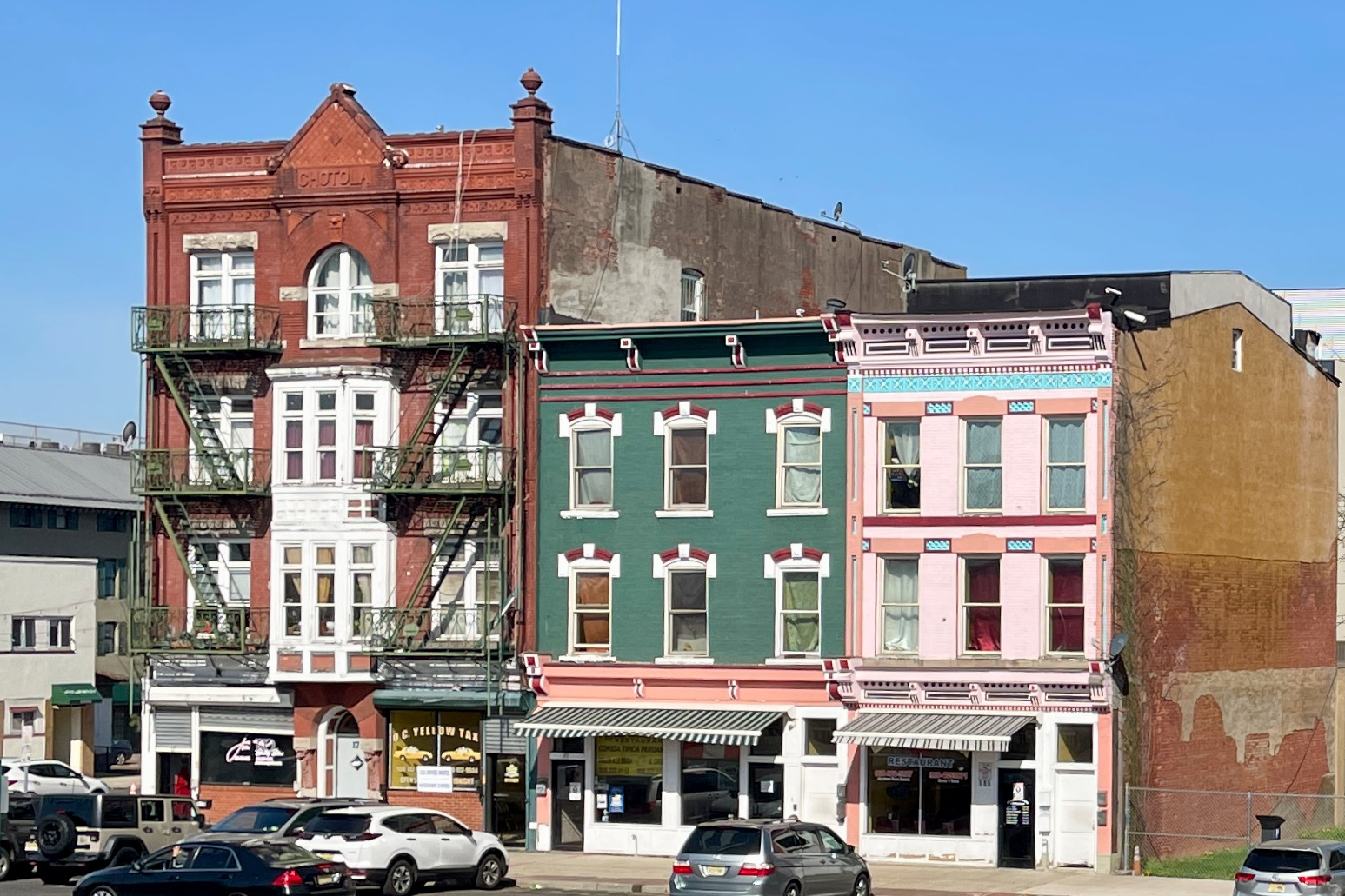
- The Chotola Building on North Avenue

- Location within Union County, New Jersey Location within New Jersey Location within the United States
- Location: Park, North, and Watchung Avenues; Plainfield, New Jersey
- Area: 9 acres (3.6 ha)
- Architectural style: Late Victorian, Richardsonian Romanesque
- NRHP reference No.: 84002836
- NJRHP No.: 2701

Significant dates
- Added to NRHP: March 29, 1984
- Designated NJRHP: February 9, 1984

The North Avenue Commercial District is a 9-acre (3.6 ha) historic district located in the city of Plainfield in Union County, New Jersey. It was added to the National Register of Historic Places on March 29, 1984, for its significance in architecture, commerce, religion, and transportation. The district, which runs along North Avenue, from Watchung Avenue on the east, to Park Avenue on the west, includes 33 contributing buildings.

== History and description ==
Most of the buildings in the district were built in the 50 years between 1875 and 1925. They are a collection of masonry Victorian commercial buildings that developed around the station of the Central Railroad of New Jersey, which arrived in 1840. The district also includes the Rahway and Plainfield Friends Meeting House, which was built in 1788.

The Chotola Building at 171–175 North Avenue was built using brick and terra cotta in 1890. It features an ornamental facade with a half round Richardsonian arch on the third floor and stone half figures on either side of the doorway.

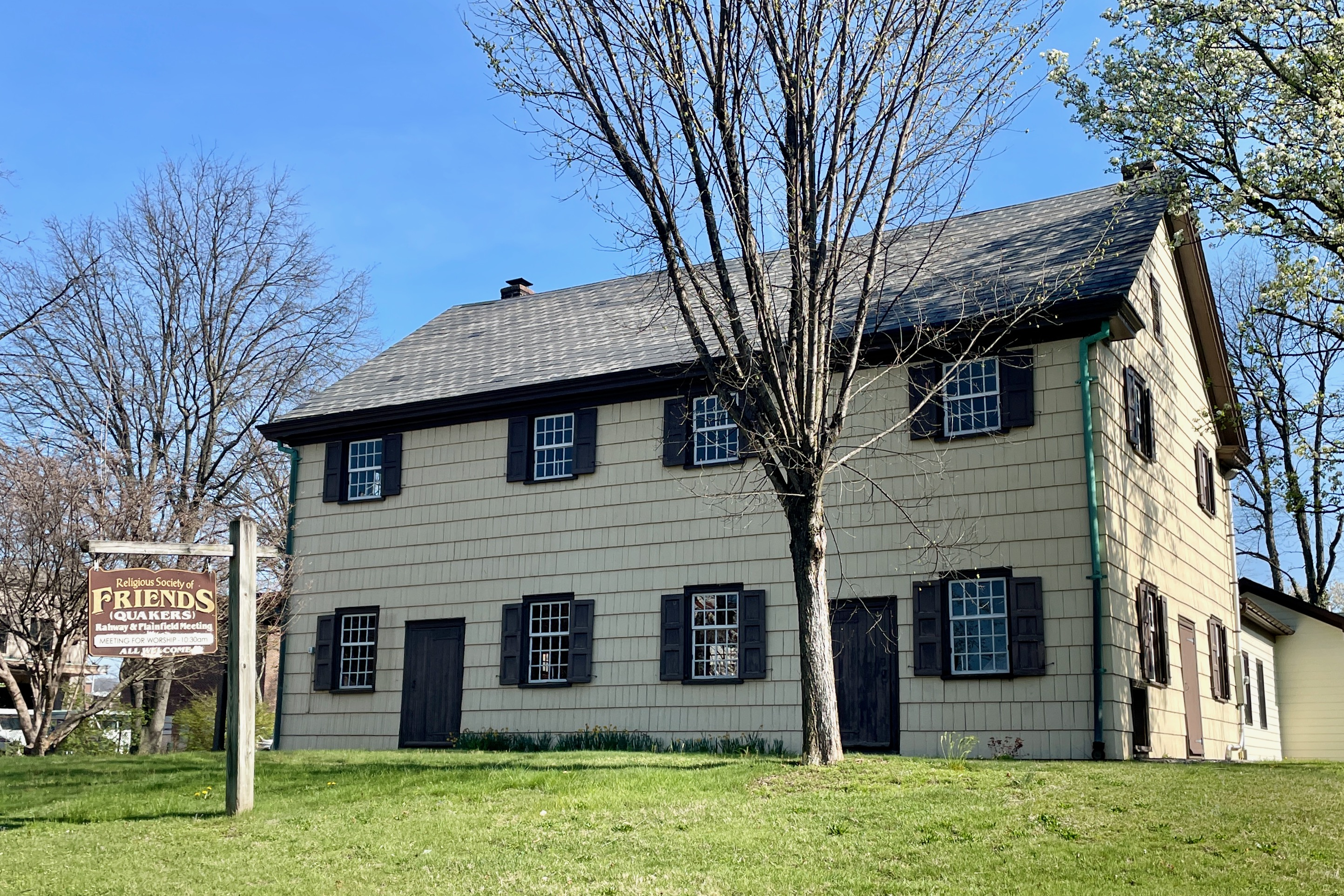
Rahway and Plainfield Friends Meeting House

== See also ==
- National Register of Historic Places listings in Union County, New Jersey
- List of the oldest buildings in New Jersey
