= Plainfield Armory =

Armory in New Jersey, USA

Coordinates: 40.6291°N 74.4033°W

The Plainfield Armory in Plainfield, New Jersey is no longer used by the New Jersey Army National Guard. The building had been the object of preservation and re-use efforts by civic organizations and municipal authorities. It was sold in 2013. It was the headquarters of the private New Jersey Naval Militia Foundation.

== History ==
First proposed in 1927, the armory was built between 1931 and 1932 as the home of Headquarters Company of the 44th Division and is representative of the small, one-company facilities designed in the 1920s and early 1930s by the State Architect's Office. The 18,000 square foot, two-story building is constructed of Flemish bond brick and is set upon by a raised basement. The administrative offices at the front sport bay windows while the back is a small drill hall, now flanked on either side by classrooms. The lobby contains a box office, which reflects its use by both the community and the National Guard. While windows and doors were replaced at a later stage, the building is only slightly altered since construction and maintains its architectural integrity as a smaller single company armory. In the early 1990s, the underutilized armory was closed and has been rented to veterans groups.

== Status ==
Tha armory was owned by the State of New Jersey, which first offered to sell it in 2005 after the New Jersey Department of Military and Veterans Affairs determined that it was a surplus building, requesting a $1 million minimum bid and stipulating that it may not be demolished. There are calls from the community that it should be purchased and converted to a broader public use. While the building was offered to the city, no offer was made, as the price is considered too high and the building would likely require renovations and the installation of an HVAC system to be made suitable for regular general use.

While the New Jersey State Historic Preservation Office has deemed the armory eligible for the state and the federal listings of historic places in Union County, New Jersey, it is not listed. Headquartered at the armory, the New Jersey Naval Militia Foundation, member of the State Guard Association of the United States and advocate of the restoration of the New Jersey Naval Militia, is a proponent of the building's listing and preservation.

In January 2012, the building was offered at auction. In December 2012 the New Jersey Legislature approved sale of the building and grounds for $926,000 as surplus property.

== See also ==
- New Jersey National Guard
- National Guard Militia Museum of New Jersey
- naval militia
