= Plainfield Civic District =

- U.S. National Register of Historic Places
- U.S. Historic district
- New Jersey Register of Historic Places
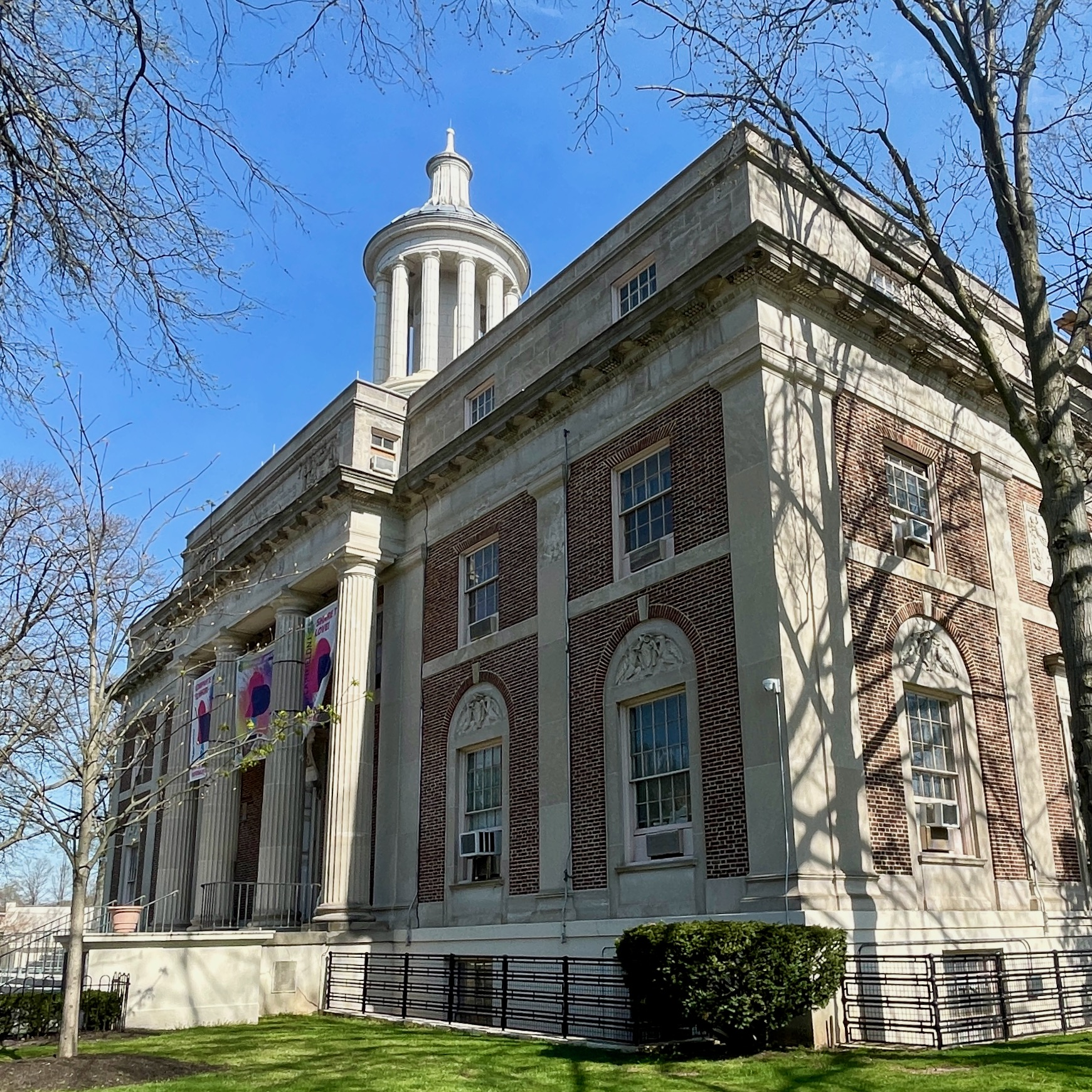
- Plainfield City Hall

- Location within Union County, New Jersey Location within New Jersey Location within the United States
- Location: Roughly, Watchung Avenue between E. Fifth and E. Seventh Streets; Plainfield, New Jersey
- Coordinates: 40°37′03″N 74°25′03″W
- Area: 2 acres (0.81 ha)
- Architectural style: Georgian Revival, Jacobethan Revival
- NRHP reference No.: 93000533
- NJRHP No.: 2703

Significant dates
- Added to NRHP: June 17, 1993
- Designated NJRHP: May 11, 1993

The Plainfield Civic District is a 2-acre (0.81 ha) historic district located in the city of Plainfield in Union County, New Jersey. It was added to the National Register of Historic Places on June 17, 1993 for its significance in architecture, politics/government, and community planning. The district includes three contributing buildings and one contributing object.

== History and description ==
The three contributing buildings in the district face Watchung Avenue. Built 1915–1919, the Plainfield City Hall was designed by architects Peck and Bottomley and features Georgian Revival architecture. Built 1922–1923, the YMCA Building is a three-story brick building featuring a limestone vestibule with Corinthian columns. Built in 1928, the former Seventh-Day Baptist Building, now the City Hall Annex, features Jacobethan Revival architecture. Built in 1927, the Plainfield War Memorial, a contributing object, features a flagpole on a tier of pink granite circular steps. East of the memorial is the Crescent Avenue Presbyterian Church, which contributes to the Crescent Area Historic District.

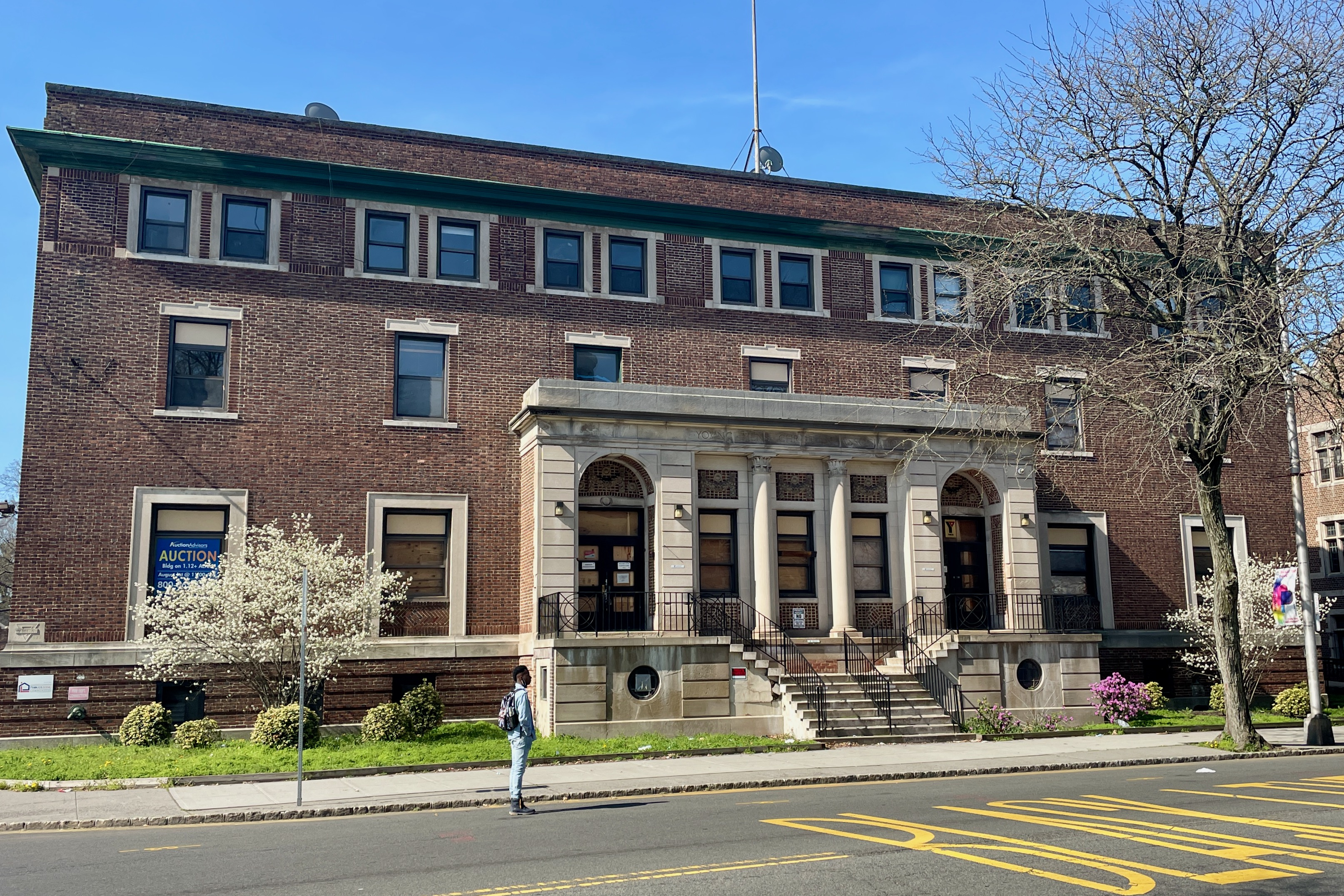
YMCA Building

== See also ==
- National Register of Historic Places listings in Union County, New Jersey
