= Plainfield Horse Show =

Annual horse show

Coordinates: 40.6064°N 74.3985°W

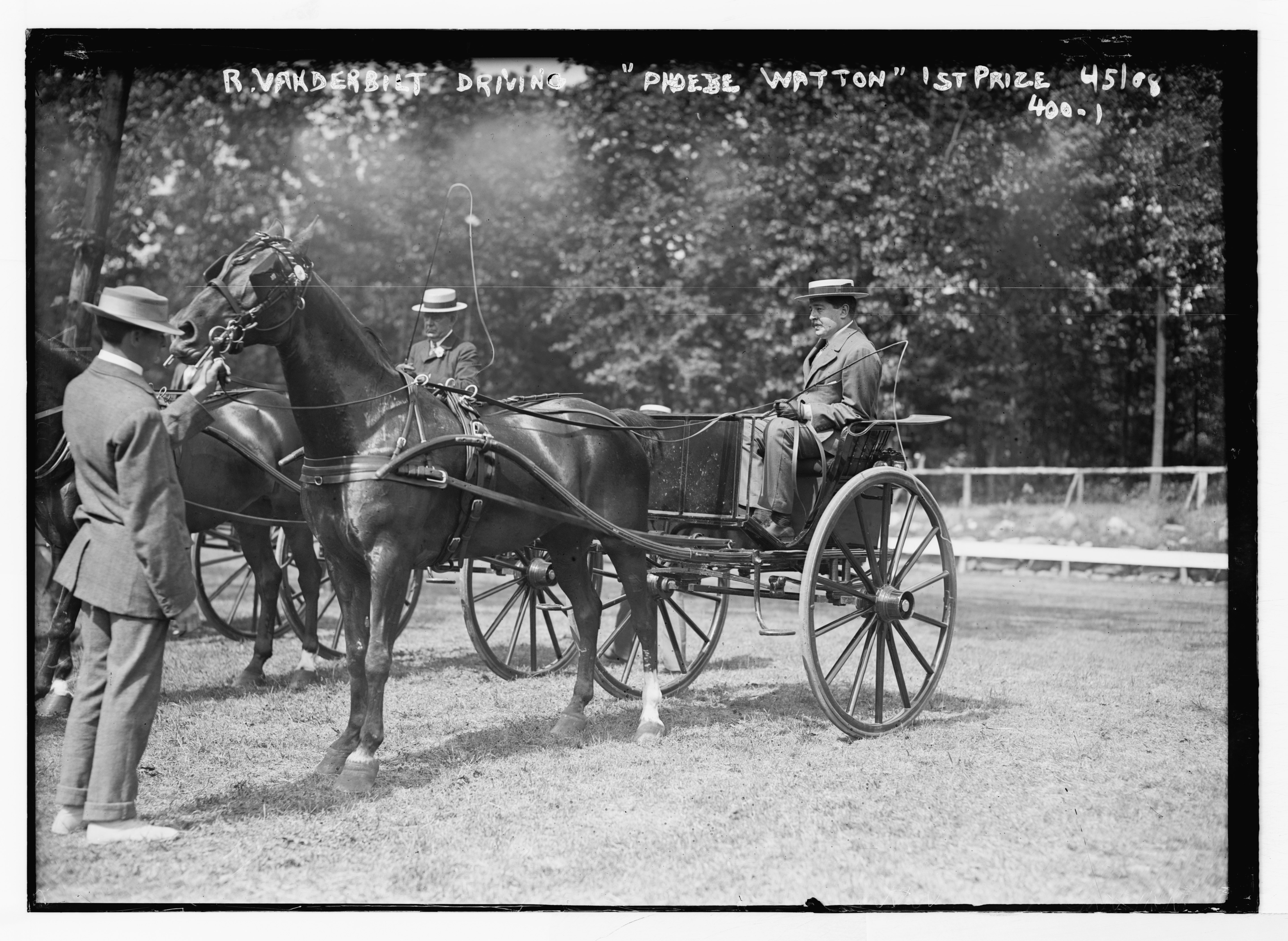
Reginald Claypoole Vanderbilt wins 1st prize at the show

The Plainfield Horse Show was an annual horse show starting in 1903 at the Plainfield Riding and Driving Club horse riding and driving club in Plainfield, New Jersey.

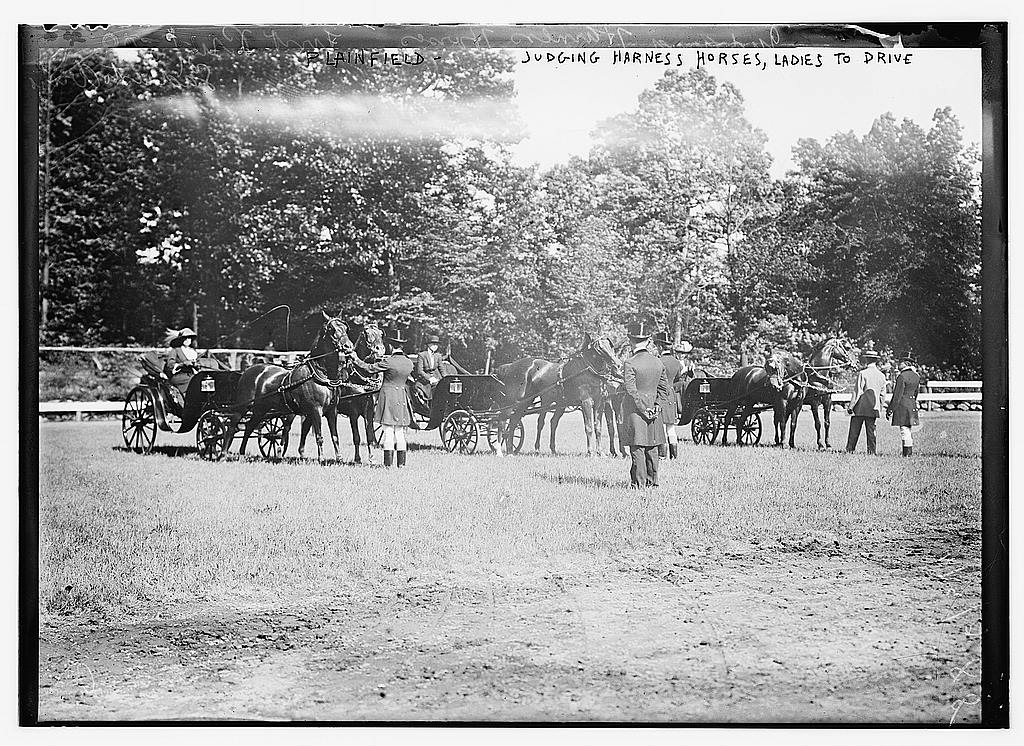
Plainfield, Judging Harness Horses, Ladies to drive LOC 2163487372
