= Marion Lee Johnson =

American mathematician

Marion Lee Johnson is an American mathematician whose work was crucial to the landing of the Apollo 11 mission. She was a mathematician on the Boeing/NASA team, where she worked in preparing data for the vehicle impact trajectories. Her perfect score over 20 successful missions earned her a place on the Apollo/Saturn V Roll of Honor.

After completion of the project, she worked for Pfizer for 26 years. She currently lives in New Jersey.

== Life and career ==
She was born in a working-class family in Savannah, Georgia, with three sisters and a brother. She attended school at Moses Jackson, in a segregated neighborhood. Very early, she fell in love with mathematics, and credits this love to her 7th grade maths teacher, Walter B. Simmons. She graduated class valedictorian from high school at Thompkins High School in 1963. In 1967, she was granted a scholarship at Talladega College in Talladega, Alabama, to study mathematics, and assumed that her degree would lead her to become a teacher. After losing her scholarship because her grades had slipped, Johnson took out a loan to continue her degree, and prioritised her studies in order to requalify for the scholarship.

After graduation, at the age of 21, she went to work as an associate engineer at Boeing Company in Huntsville, Alabama. She was assigned to the Launch Systems branch of the Boeing/NASA team at the Marshall Space Flight Centre to prepare the landing of the Apollo 11 mission. At the time, very few women worked at the Space Flight Centre. Johnson worked under the supervision of Arthur Rudolph and rocket designer Wernher von Braun, on the calculations to simulate vehicle piece impact trajectories (where the booster rockets would fall). According to Lee, Boeing was a diverse place. In an interview for 1010 WINS' with Larry Mullins in 2018, she said: "You had a lot of people there - a lot of people from all different cultures - and we all worked together." According to Johnson, it was only after seeing the 2016 movie Hidden Figures that she realised how important her own contributions were to NASA.

After two years working for Boeing/NASA, Johnson then went to work at Pfizer, Inc., where she became Project Leader for the Corporate Information Technology Division. She retired from Pfizer after 26 years.

A resident of Union County, New Jersey, she recently retired from Branford Hall Career Institute as a Computer Networking and Security Instructor. The city of Plainfield awarded Johnson the key to the city, and designated two days to honor her legacy. She is married to J. Frank Johnson, the owner of an accounting, tax, audit, and advisory services company, with whom she has three children.
