= Melissa Sue Anderson =

American-Canadian actress (born 1962)

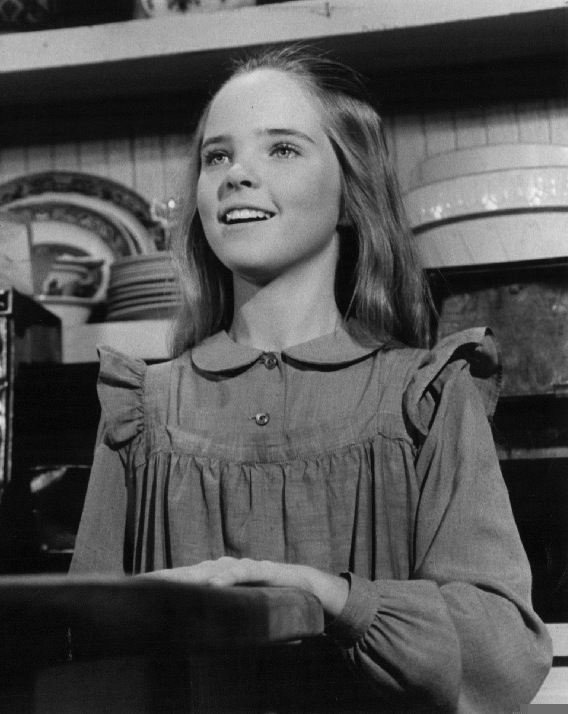
- Anderson as Mary Ingalls in Little House on the Prairie, 1974
- Born: September 26, 1962 (age 63); Berkeley, California, U.S.
- Citizenship: American; Canadian
- Occupation: Actress
- Years active: 1972–present
- Known for: Little House on the Prairie; Midnight Offerings; Happy Birthday to Me; Which Mother Is Mine?
- Spouse: Michael Sloan (m. 1990; died 2025)
- Children: 2

Melissa Sue Anderson (born September 26, 1962) is an American-Canadian actress. She began her career as a child actress after appearing in several commercials in Los Angeles. Anderson is known for her role as Mary Ingalls in the NBC drama series Little House on the Prairie (1974–1983), for which she received a nomination for the Primetime Emmy Award for Outstanding Lead Actress in a Drama Series.

She is also known for film roles that include Vivian in Midnight Offerings (1981), Ginny in the slasher film Happy Birthday to Me (1981), and Alex in the ABC Afterschool Special, Which Mother Is Mine? (1979).

Anderson became a naturalized citizen of Canada in 2007. In 2010, she published The Way I See It: A Look Back at My Life on Little House, an autobiographical account of her years acting in Little House on the Prairie.

== Early life ==
Anderson was born on September 26, 1962, in Berkeley, California, the second of two daughters, to James and Marion Anderson. Her sister Maureen is 12 years her senior. When she was seven years old, Anderson's family relocated from the San Francisco Bay Area to Los Angeles. Her parents divorced when she was 13 years old, and she was raised Catholic by her mother. As a young child, Anderson appeared in commercials for Mattel and Sears.

== Career ==
Anderson's show-business career began when a dance teacher urged her parents to find an agent for her. After appearing in commercials, she was soon in demand for television roles. Another memorable early role was as Millicent, a girl who kissed Bobby in The Brady Bunch. She also appeared in an episode of Shaft the same year.

At the age of 11, Anderson landed the role of Mary Ingalls in Little House on the Prairie. She would go on to star in the series for eight seasons, beginning in 1974, and leaving after season seven; she later appeared in three episodes of season eight in late 1981.

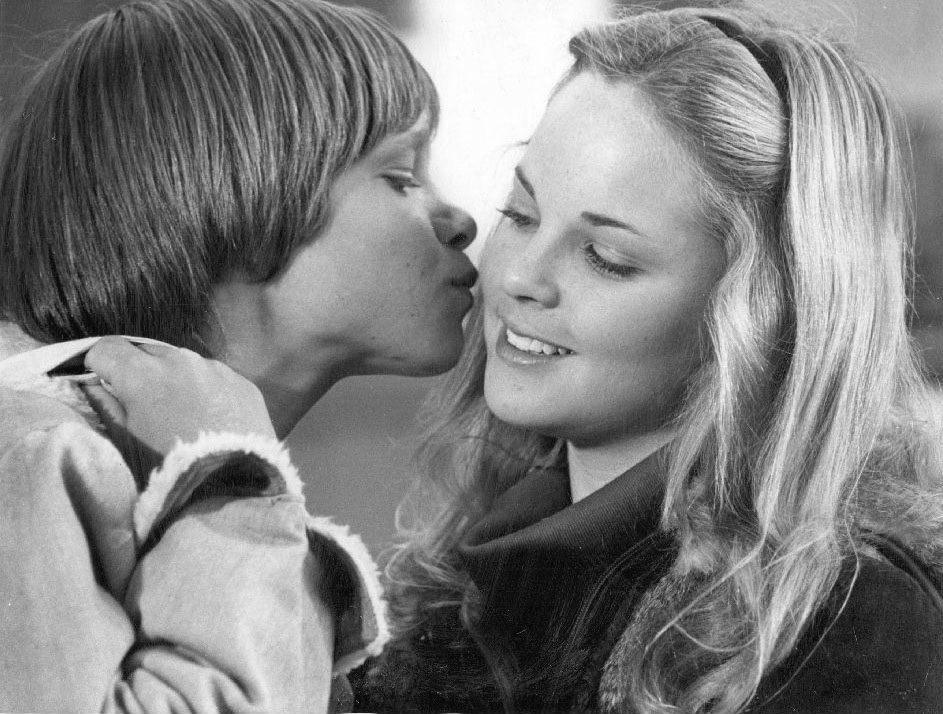
Anderson with Lance Kerwin in the television film James at 15 (1977)

In 1976, Michael Landon asked Anderson if she would appear in his autobiographical film The Loneliest Runner. Anderson agreed to play Nancy Rizzi, the first girlfriend of John Curtis (based on Landon and played by Lance Kerwin), saying she was very thrilled to have been asked. In 1977, she once again co-starred as the love interest opposite Kerwin in the television film James at 15.

She was nominated for a 1978 Primetime Emmy Award for Best Leading Actress in a Drama Series for her work on Little House on the Prairie and won the Emmy Award for her performance in Which Mother Is Mine?, which aired as an ABC Afterschool Special in 1979. Also in 1979, she played the title role of Dana Lee Gilbert, a North Dakota transfer student to Los Angeles' San Fernando Valley, in CBS's television film Survival of Dana.

In 1980, Anderson earned a 'TP de Oro' Award (considered to be Spain's most prestigious award for television) for 'Best Foreign Actress' for her role in Little House on the Prairie. This followed a successful visit to Spain in 1979 to appear as a guest on Televisión Española's program, 625 Lineas. In 1981, she earned a Young Artist Award nomination for her performance in the Canadian slasher film Happy Birthday to Me. After leaving Little House, she continued acting in television series like The Equalizer, Alfred Hitchcock Presents, CHiPs, and Murder, She Wrote, and was the associate producer for the penultimate television project Michael Landon made before dying: Where Pigeons Go to Die (1990).

In 1998, she was inducted into the Western Performers Hall of Fame at the National Cowboy & Western Heritage Museum in Oklahoma City, Oklahoma. In 1999, she starred alongside Heather Langenkamp in the short-lived television series Partners. In 2014, Anderson had an uncredited appearance as Stosh's mother in the neo-noir mystery comedy drama film Veronica Mars (2014).

== Book ==
In 2010, Anderson released an autobiography titled The Way I See It: A Look Back at My Life on Little House. The book, which is primarily based on her life during her years as a child star in Little House on the Prairie, contains behind-the-scenes stories and anecdotes about the show itself, its stars, guest stars, and crew members. The autobiography also covers her pre– and post–Little House career, her side-projects during the Little House years and how her personal life was affected by her career.

== Personal life ==
Anderson married television writer and producer Michael Sloan in 1990. They have two children, daughter Piper and son Griffin. The family moved to Montreal in 2002 and became naturalized Canadians on Canada Day in 2007. Sloan died on August 13, 2025, in New York City.

== Filmography ==
=== Film ===
Melissa Sue Anderson film credits
Year	Title	Role	Notes
1981	Happy Birthday to Me	Virginia Wainwright	
1984	Goma-2	Kukki	Uncredited
1984	Chattanooga Choo Choo	Jennie	
1988	The Suicide Club	Laura Donovan on TV	
1988	Far North	Young Nurse	
1989	Looking Your Best		
1990	Dead Men Don't Die	Dulcie Niles	
1991	Manuel		
1994	Animated Stories from the Bible: Music Video – Volume 1	Snake	Video; voice role
1995	Killer Lady	American Lady	
2006	Crazy Eights	Hospital Patient	Uncredited
2010	Marker 187		Short film
2014	Veronica Mars	Stosh's Mother	Uncredited
2018	The Con Is On	Guest Two	

=== Television ===
Melissa Sue Anderson television credits
Year	Title	Role	Notes
1973	The Brady Bunch	Millicent	Episode: "Never Too Young"
1973	Shaft	Cathy Muder (uncredited)	Episode: "The Enforcers"
1974–1981	Little House on the Prairie	Mary Ingalls	Main role
1976	The Loneliest Runner	Nancy Rizzi	TV movie
1977	James at 15	Lacey Stevens	Episode: "Pilot"
1977	ABC Afterschool Special	Kate	Episode: "Very Good Friends"
1978	The Hanna-Barbera Happy Hour	Director of the musical	Episode No. 2
1978–1980 & 1986	The Love Boat	Jennifer 'Chubs' Smith / Cindy Jerome / Cathy Cummings / Dana Colton	4 episodes
1979	Survival of Dana	Dana Lee Gilbert	TV movie
1979	ABC Afterschool Special	Alexandria 'Alex' Benton	Episode: "Which Mother Is Mine?"
1979	A New Kind of Family	Lisa	Episode: "The Overcharge"
1979	CHiPs	Herself	Episode: "Roller Disco" (Part 2)
1980	Fantasy Island	Amy Marson	Episode: "Rogues to Riches/Stark Terror"
1980	Insight	Mary Beth	Episode: "Princess"
1981	Midnight Offerings	Vivian Sotherland	TV movie
1981	Advice to the Lovelorn	Maureen Tyler	TV movie
1982	An Innocent Love	Molly Rush	TV movie
1982–1983	Spider-Man and His Amazing Friends	Kitty Pryde / Sprite	Voice, 2 episodes
1983	First Affair	Toby King	TV movie
1984	Finder of Lost Loves	Nikki Gatos	Episode: "Pilot"
1984	Murder, She Wrote	Eve Crystal	Episode: "Hooray for Homicide"
1984	Glitter	Elizabeth	Episode: "A Minor Miracle"
1984–1985	Hotel	Cassie Ray / Anne Goldman	2 episodes
1986	Dark Mansions	Noelle Drake	TV movie
1987	The Equalizer	Yvette Marcel	2 Episodes: "Memories of Manon: Parts 1 & 2"
1988–1989	Alfred Hitchcock Presents	Laura Donovan / Julie Fenton	2 episodes
1988	The Equalizer	Yvette Marcel	2 Episodes: "The Mystery of Manon: Parts 1 & 2"
1989	The Return of Sam McCloud	Colleen McCloud	
1993–1994	X-Men: The Animated Series	Snowbird	Voice, 2 episodes
1994	Burke's Law	Michelle Ryder	Episode: "Who Killed Alexander the Great?"
1998	Earthquake in New York	Dr. Marilyn Blake	TV movie
1999	Partners	Cheryl Darrin	3 episodes
2000	Thin Ice	Tanya Ferguson	TV movie
2006	10.5: Apocalypse	First Lady Megan Hollister	Miniseries
2007	Marco Polo	Mother	Voice, uncredited
