= The Survival of Dana =

- Genre: Crime; Drama
- Teleplay by: Frank Norwood
- Story by: Tom Lazarus; Frank Norwood
- Directed by: Jack Starrett
- Starring: Melissa Sue Anderson; Robert Carradine; Marion Ross
- Music by: Craig Safan
- Country of origin: United States
- Original language: English

Production
- Executive producers: Tony Converse; Roger Gimbel
- Producer: Marc Trabulus
- Production location: Los Angeles
- Cinematography: Bruce Logan
- Editor: Joy Wilson
- Running time: 96 min.
- Production company: EMI Television

Original release
- Network: CBS
- Release: May 29, 1979

Survival of Dana is a 1979 CBS made-for-TV film, a teenage drama starring Melissa Sue Anderson, who experiences conflicting social values when her parents divorce and she moves from Fargo, North Dakota to the San Fernando Valley suburbs of Los Angeles.

The cast also includes Robert Carradine, Talia Balsam (Martin Balsam's only child), Marion Ross, and Judge Reinhold in his first film. Anderson was on hiatus from Little House on the Prairie and Ross (playing Dana's grandmother) was at the time a star on the series Happy Days. Survival of Dana was directed by Jack Starrett, whose only child, Jennifer, plays Lynn, one of the members of the antisocial clique.

== Plot ==
Dana Lee Gilbert has moved from Fargo to the San Fernando Valley to live with her widowed grandmother after her parents' divorce. She finds her new school, Tremont High, was vandalized the night before by a teenage gang unknown to her led by Donny Davis. At the end of her first day, she watches the school's ice skating team practice and wants to try out for it. Waiting for her grandmother at a shopping mall, she meets another Tremont girl, Rona Simms, who shoplifts and they are both arrested. Banned from skating, she joins the gang and starts dating Donny. One of the gang's big plans brings them into conflict with adult criminals.

== Cast ==
- Melissa Sue Anderson as Dana Lee Gilbert
- Robert Carradine as Donny Davis
- Marion Ross as Madeline
- Talia Balsam as Rona Simms
- Michael Pataki as Arnold
- Kevin Breslin as Skates
- Judge Reinhold as Bear
- Dan Spector as Anthony
- Barbara Babcock as Lorna Sims
- Shelby Leverington as Mrs. Blake
- Dawn Jeffory as Joanie
- Trent Dolan as Coach Tanner
- Scott McGinnis as Paul
