= Springfield Presbyterian Church (Springfield, New Jersey) =

Historic church in New Jersey, United States

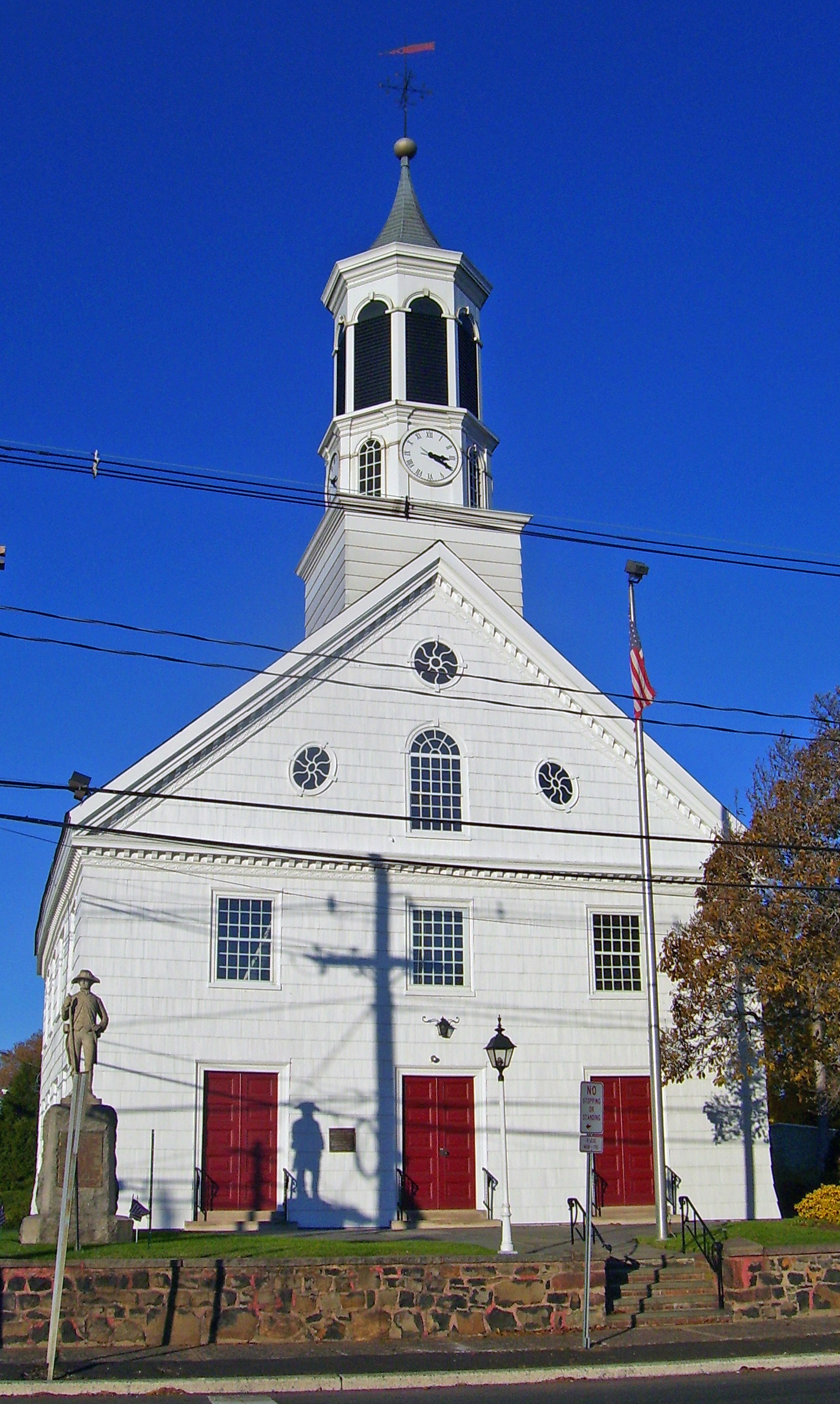
- Church in 2007

Religion
- Affiliation: Presbyterian
- Year consecrated: 1745

Location
- Location: Springfield, New Jersey
- Interactive map of Springfield Presbyterian Church
- Coordinates: 40°42′40″N 74°18′36″W

Architecture
- Style: Federal, Greek Revival, Gothic Revival
- Completed: 1791

Specifications
- Direction of façade: west
- Materials: wood
- First Congregation of the Presbyterian Church of Springfield
- U.S. National Register of Historic Places
- New Jersey Register of Historic Places
- NRHP reference No.: 90000668
- NJRHP No.: 2725

Significant dates
- Added to NRHP: May 7, 1990
- Designated NJRHP: January 11, 1990

The Springfield Presbyterian Church is located on Morris Avenue (Route 82) in downtown Springfield, in Union County, New Jersey, United States. The congregation was first established in 1745 and the current church was built in 1791.

The church had been used to store ammunition for the Continental Army during the Revolutionary War and at the Battle of Springfield the church was burned by British and Loyalist troops passing through the township on their way to nearby Hobart Gap.

Listed as the First Congregation of the Presbyterian Church at Springfield, it was added to the National Register of Historic Places on May 7, 1990, for its significance in architecture. The listing included three contributing buildings and one contributing site on 3 acres (1.2 ha); architectural styles included are Greek Revival, Gothic Revival, and Federal.

== See also ==
- National Register of Historic Places listings in Union County, New Jersey
