= Honky (film) =

- Theatrical release poster
- Directed by: William Graham
- Screenplay by: Will Chaney
- Based on: Sheila by Gunard Solberg
- Produced by: Will Chaney
- Starring: Brenda Sykes; John Neilson
- Cinematography: Ralph Woolsey
- Edited by: Jim Benson
- Music by: Quincy Jones
- Production companies: Getty & Fromkess Corporation; Stonehenge Productions
- Distributed by: Jack H. Harris Enterprises
- Release date: 1971
- Running time: 92 minutes
- Country: United States
- Language: English

Honky is a 1971 romance film directed by William Graham that depicts the love story of Sheila Smith and Wayne "Honky" Devine, an interracial high school couple. The tagline for the movie was "A love story... of hate". It was nominated for a Golden Globe for Best Original Song for "Something More" by Quincy Jones and Bradford Craig at the 29th Golden Globes.

== Synopsis ==
High school classmates, wealthy Sheila Smith, who is black and working class Wayne "Honky" Devine, who is white, begin dating and fall in love.

== Cast ==
- Brenda Sykes as Sheila Smith
- John Neilson as Wayne "Honky" Devine
- William Marshall as Dr. Craig Smith
- Maia Danziger as Sharon
- Marion Ross as Mrs. Divine
- John Lasell as Archer Divine
- Lincoln Kilpatrick as Fabulous Traveling Shoes

== Reviews ==
The film received mixed reviews. The New York Times writer Howard Thompson began his review by saying "Honky is awful".

TV Guide called the film ""Socially relevant" at the time, now just an overblown, clichéd anachronism, Honky details an interracial relationship between young white man Nielson and rich black girl Sykes."

== See also ==
- List of American films of 1971
