= The Loneliest Runner =

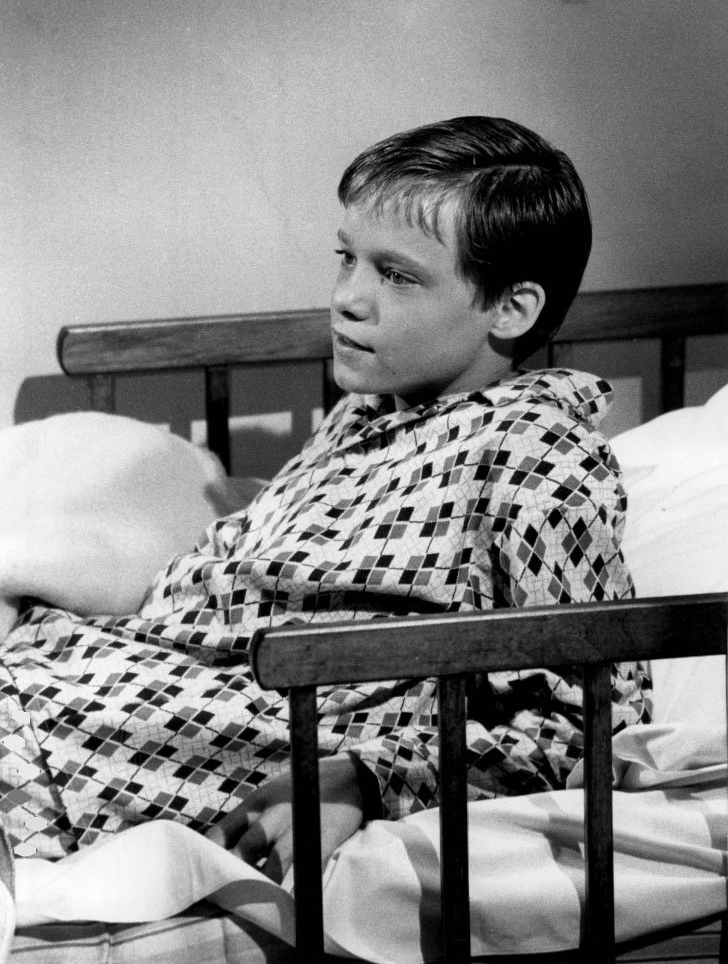
- Lance Kerwin stars as John Curtis
- Genre: Drama; Sport
- Written by: Michael Landon
- Directed by: Michael Landon
- Starring: Lance Kerwin; Brian Keith; DeAnn Mears
- Theme music composer: David Rose

Production
- Producer: Michael Landon
- Production locations: John Marshall High School, 3939 Tracy Street, Los Feliz, Los Angeles, California; Griffith Observatory, 2800 E Observatory Rd, Los Angeles, California; Mount Hollywood Drive Tunnel, Los Angeles, California
- Cinematography: Ted Voigtlander
- Editor: John Loeffler
- Running time: 74 minutes
- Production company: Universal Television

Original release
- Network: NBC
- Release: December 20, 1976

The Loneliest Runner is a semi-autobiographical made-for-television film written, produced and directed by Bonanza star Michael Landon. It first aired on December 20, 1976 on NBC and starred Lance Kerwin, Brian Keith, DeAnn Mears, and Landon's Little House on the Prairie daughter, Melissa Sue Anderson. The film was nominated for two Emmy Awards.

== Synopsis ==
John Curtis wins an Olympic marathon. He prepares to be interviewed on television by Rafer Johnson afterward, told that he will be asked questions like what got him into running. He flashes back to his childhood.

As a 12-year-old suffering from chronic bedwetting, John wakes up early every day to change his soiled sheets and pajamas before his parents can see, running them down to the laundromat on the way to school. His supportive father, Arnold, had promised him a regular bed to replace his child-sized bed if he can stay dry until his next birthday days later. John’s mother Alice is shrill and strident, accusing him of either being too lazy to get out of bed at night to urinate or being spiteful against her.

Nancy Rizzi, a new classmate and next door neighbor, takes an interest in John and they walk home together and make plans to be study partners.

John’s father offers to drive him down to a football game early Saturday morning to watch John play with his team. John wakes up even earlier than normal to wash his sheets but finds the laundromat is still closed at that hour. After a resounding victory, Arnold proudly drives John and his teammates home. As they pull up, everybody sees John’s soiled sheet, which his mother had found and hung out of his bedroom window to humiliate him. John’s friends make excuses and walk home. With Alice goading him, Arnold decides to scold John.

An embarrassed John tells his friends a story that he had picked up a stray puppy that wet his bed but they seem unconvinced. Nancy offers to walk home with him after football practice, but John races home alone to pull in his sheet so she won’t see it. He tells his parents that he’s quitting the football team because he lost his gear, which he actually threw out so he wouldn’t have to go to practice and could get home in time to pull in his sheet. For months, he continues to run home every day after school to hide the sheet.

John’s parents take him to a doctor, who says there’s no apparent medical reason for John’s condition, but that some boys have very deep sleep cycles that don’t allow them to wake up. He asks if Arnold had a bedwetting problem since the condition affects boys more and is often hereditary. Arnold denies it. Alice is combative and refuses to take the doctor’s advice to stop embarrassing John.

At gym class, the coach orders the class to run a mile on the track. He’s astonished to see John build and hold a huge lead on the other boys. He calls the varsity track coach to tell him John has broken the school record, being faster than even the high school seniors. Impressed, the track coach invites John to practice with the track team after school but John declines so he can run home and hide his sheet. Alice refuses to delay hanging his sheet outside if he wants to run track.

John’s friends invite him to a sleepover. Alice accepts for him, believing that it will be proof of whether John’s bedwetting is voluntary or involuntary. John reluctantly attends, then spends the entire night awake after the others go to sleep. Alice believes her accusations are confirmed.

Nancy’s father shows up after school to surprise her with his new car, a Ford Thunderbird convertible. He offers John a ride home with them, but John starts running down hills and slopes, desperately trying to get home before the Rizzis. He arrives just in time to see the Rizzis pull into their driveway next door. Mortified that Nancy saw the sheet in his window, he turns and runs away. His parents are worried that night when he doesn’t return home and eventually call the police.

John has hidden away in a department store, coming out after everybody else has left. He spies a mannequin clad in the uniform of the Los Angeles Rams, his favorite team, and runs around the store after changing into it. He stops in awe when he suddenly finds himself in the bedroom department, confronted with a large display of beds. He lies down contentedly in one and quickly falls asleep.

John is found by store personnel the next morning. The store won’t press charges because John did no damage. John explains to his father that in the relaxed surroundings without the pressure of his mother's constant hectoring, he was able to stay dry that night. Arnold is proud even as Alice keeps badgering while they talk. He finally stands up to her, ordering her to shut up. He sheepishly admits that he was a bedwetter himself until he was 14. John empathetically forgives his father's secret shame. They go outside to wait until the store opens, as Arnold intends to buy John any new bed he wants immediately.

John goes to track practice after school, where Nancy agrees to wait to walk home with him afterward.

Back in the present, the interviewer asks John the question of what interested him in running. He credits his parents.

== Creation of film ==
Michael Landon was the real-life version of the loneliest runner. As a child, he wet his bed until he was 14 and his mother, Peggy O'Neill, really did hang his sheets to dry outside of his bedroom window as punishment. The dysfunctional family life that Landon experienced during his early life was also similar to the ones in this autobiographical film.

The character of John Curtis is modeled after Landon, as are his parents and other supporting characters. Landon cast actor Walker Edmiston, who had previously appeared on Bonanza, to play Doctor Claymore. Coincidentally, Edmiston later guest-starred on Little House as different doctors in seasons five and nine, as well as appearing in season three. Landon also asked his on-screen daughter, Melissa Sue Anderson to play Nancy Rizzi, saying the part was perfect for her. Melissa says she was both honored and thrilled to have been included.

Prior to acting, Landon also had Olympic ambitions as a javelin thrower. Due to an injury in his shoulder ligaments during college, Landon was unable to pursue a career in sports and started acting, which eventually led to three very successful television series, in addition to other acting, directing, and writing jobs on other shows.

== Cast ==
- Lance Kerwin as John Curtis
- Brian Keith as Arnold Curtis
- DeAnn Mears as Alice Curtis
- Melissa Sue Anderson as Nancy Rizzi
- Rafer Johnson as himself
- Michael Landon as the adult John Curtis
- Randy Faustino as Tony, John's friend and teammate
- Dermott Downs as Donnie, John's friend and teammate
- Walker Edmiston as Doctor Claymore
- Herb Vigran as the Security Guard
- Clifford A. Pellow as George Sanders
- Bing Russell as Fred Dawkins
- Robert Hackman as Mr. Rizzi
- Barbara Collentine as Miss King

== See also ==
- List of films about the sport of athletics
