= The Greatest Gift (film) =

1974 film by Boris Sagal

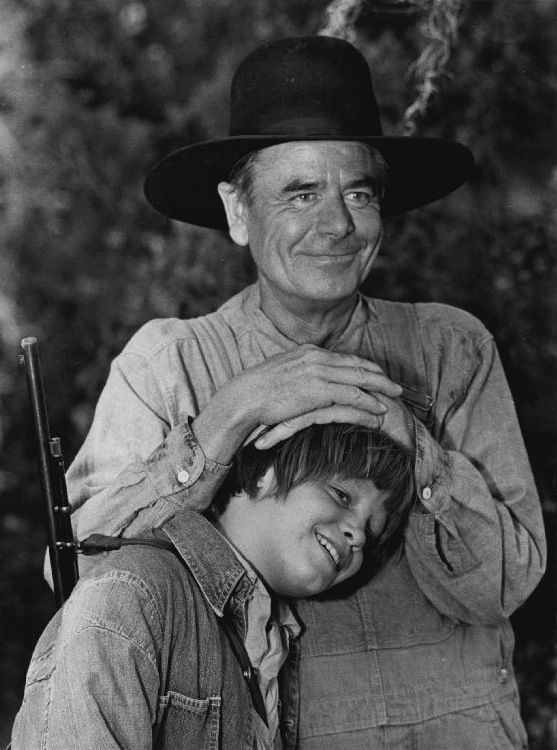
- Glenn Ford and Lance Kerwin as Reverend and Ramey Holvak
- Genre: Drama
- Based on: Ramey by Jack Farris
- Written by: Abby Mann (as Ben Goodman)
- Directed by: Boris Sagal
- Starring: Glenn Ford; Julie Harris; Lance Kerwin
- Theme music composer: Richard DeBenedictis
- Country of origin: United States
- Original language: English

Production
- Producer: Dean Hargrove
- Cinematography: Stevan Larner
- Editors: Howard Epstein; Douglas Stewart
- Running time: 100 minutes
- Production company: Universal Television

Original release
- Network: NBC
- Release: November 4, 1974

Related
- The Family Holvak

The Greatest Gift is an NBC television movie which premiered on November 4, 1974. Directed by Boris Sagal and starring Glenn Ford, Julie Harris, and Lance Kerwin, the film served as the pilot for the 1975 television series The Family Holvak.

== Synopsis ==
Humble Depression-era preacher Reverend Holvak (Glenn Ford) lives with his wife Elizabeth (Julie Harris) and son Ramey (Lance Kerwin) and struggles against the injustice of violence and a corrupt sheriff in an attempt to maintain the moral values of their faith in their small town.

== Cast ==
Actor	Role
Glenn Ford	Rev. Holvak
Julie Harris	Elizabeth Holvak
Lance Kerwin	Ramey Holvak
Cari Anne Warder-Kueltzo	Julie Mae Holvak
Harris Yulin	Hog Yancy
Charles Tyner	Amos Goodloe
Furman Walters	Willis Graham
Dabbs Greer	Deacon Hurd
