= Midnight Offerings =

- Genre: Horror
- Written by: Juanita Bartlett
- Directed by: Rod Holcomb
- Starring: Melissa Sue Anderson; Mary Beth McDonough; Patrick Cassidy
- Music by: Walter Scharf
- Country of origin: United States
- Original language: English

Production
- Executive producers: Stephen J. Cannell; Juanita Bartlett
- Producer: Alex Beaton
- Cinematography: Héctor R. Figueroa
- Editor: Christopher Nelson
- Running time: 100 minutes
- Production company: Stephen J. Cannell Productions

Original release
- Network: ABC
- Release: February 27, 1981

Midnight Offerings is a 1981 American made-for-television horror film directed by Rod Holcomb, and starring Melissa Sue Anderson, Mary Beth McDonough, and Patrick Cassidy. Its plot follows a teenage witch who uses her powers to vie for the attention of her former boyfriend. The film premiered on ABC in February 1981.

In one of her first television acting roles, Vanna White was cast here in a minor role as Devona.

== Cast ==
- Melissa Sue Anderson as Vivian Sotherland
- Mary Beth McDonough as Robin Prentiss
- Patrick Cassidy as David Sterling
- Marion Ross as Emily Moore
- Gordon Jump as Sherman Sotherland
- Cathryn Damon as Diane Sotherland
- Dana Kimmell as Lily
