= Mark Melni =

Mark Melni is a solo pianist based in Twin Falls, Idaho.

Coming from a lineage of musical scholars, Mark Melni is the second in his family to produce an album. Born in Springfield, New Jersey, Mark was raised in Santa Barbara, California, where he attended private lessons from Helen Groutes and Reginald Stuart through the Academy of the West. He has raised his family in Twin Falls, Idaho. There he has continued to compose music and organize some of his life's work for this album, with the endless support of his wife, Mary. After refining his music with the help of Kelly Yost and including the artistic talents of his oldest son, Paul, he has presented a great compilation of Lost Art.

In the summer of 2007, Mark Melni invented The Melni Electrical Connector in his garage.

With a design concept similar to the Chinese finger trap, the invention contains an electrically conductive spiral that, once the connector is twisted, is able to “grip” stripped wires, cables and other elongated elements and securely connect them.

Thus eliminating the time-consuming, unreliable and expensive crimping, soldering and wrapping that is prevalent with many current electrical connectors.
