= Hutchings Homestead =

United States historic place

- U.S. National Register of Historic Places
- New Jersey Register of Historic Places
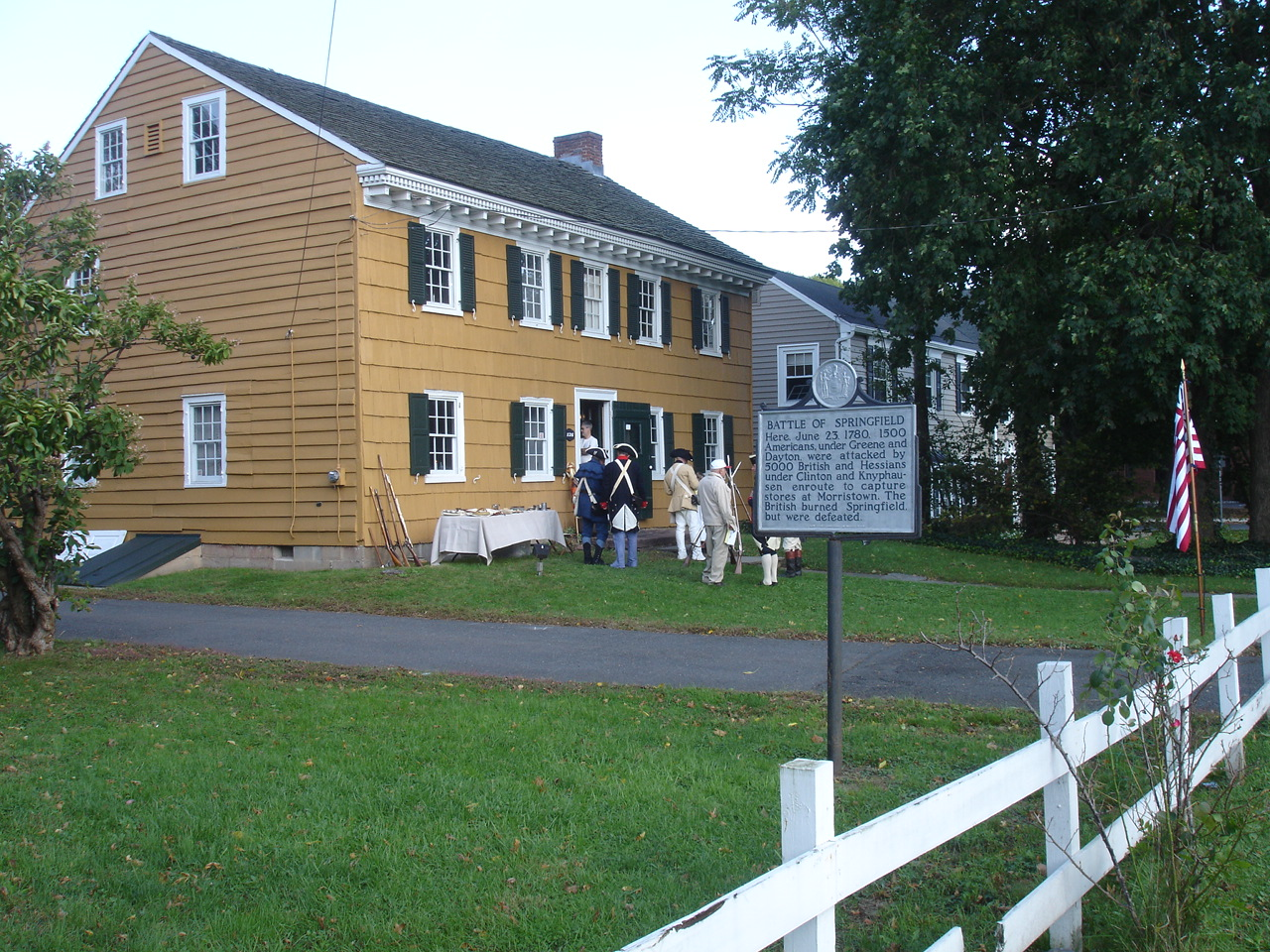
- The Hutchings Homestead, or Cannon Ball House, in fall 2011

- Location within Union County, New Jersey Location within New Jersey Location within the United States
- Nearest city: Springfield Township, Union County, New Jersey
- Coordinates: 40°42′37″N 74°18′26″W
- Area: 0.5 acres (0.20 ha)
- Built: 1741
- Architectural style: Georgian
- NRHP reference No.: 77000915
- NJRHP No.: 2724

Significant dates
- Added to NRHP: September 16, 1977
- Designated NJRHP: February 2, 1978

The Hutchings Homestead, also known as the Cannon Ball House, is in Springfield, Union County, New Jersey. The homestead was built in 1741 and was added to the National Register of Historic Places on September 16, 1977.

== See also ==
- National Register of Historic Places listings in Union County, New Jersey
