= The Boy Who Drank Too Much =

1980 television film directed by Jerrold Freedman

- Genre: Drama; Family; Sport
- Based on: The Boy Who Drank Too Much by Shep Greene
- Written by: Edward DeBlasio
- Directed by: Jerrold Freedman
- Starring: Scott Baio; Lance Kerwin; Ed Lauter; Mariclare Costello
- Music by: Michael Small
- Country of origin: United States
- Original language: English

Production
- Executive producer: Jerry McNeely
- Producer: Donald A. Baer
- Production locations: Madison, Wisconsin; Los Angeles
- Cinematography: Allen Daviau
- Editor: Anthony Redman
- Running time: 99 min
- Production companies: Company Four; MTM Enterprises

Original release
- Network: CBS
- Release: February 6, 1980

The Boy Who Drank Too Much is a 1980 American made-for-television drama film based on a novel by Shep Greene. The film was initially broadcast on CBS and sponsored by Xerox, and starred Scott Baio as a high school hockey player struggling with alcoholism. While its approach is that of a typical after school special, the film was presented as a prime time made-for-TV movie, which was seen February 6, 1980 at 9:00 pm ET/PT. Taking a form of a 20th-century morality play, the film dealt with a serious issue of alcoholism, that might confront youth in a prescriptive manner.

== Plot ==
Baio stars as Buff Saunders, a teen hockey player well-liked and respected among his coaches and teammates. He battles to hide the truth from his elders and peers that, like his father, he is an alcoholic. He struggles to remain clean and sober in order not to lose his position on the team and the respect of his friends.

== Cast ==
- Scott Baio as Buff Saunders
- Lance Kerwin as Billy Carpenter
- Ed Lauter as Gus Carpenter
- Mariclare Costello as Louis Carpenter
- Stephen Davies as Alan
- Toni Kalem as Tina
- Katherine Pass as Donna Watson
- Dan Shoras Art 'Artie' Collins
- Michele Tobin as Julie
- Don Murray as Ken Saunders
- The Madison Pergolders [hockey team]
- Brian Borgrud

== Production ==
Filming for the movie took place in Los Angeles, California and Madison, Wisconsin.

== Home media ==
MTM Home Video released the film on VHS in 1993 as a part of the "MTM Home Video Movie Collection."

== See also ==
- List of films about ice hockey
