= Springfield Township, Union County, New Jersey =

Township in Union County, New Jersey, US

Springfield Township, New Jersey
- Township
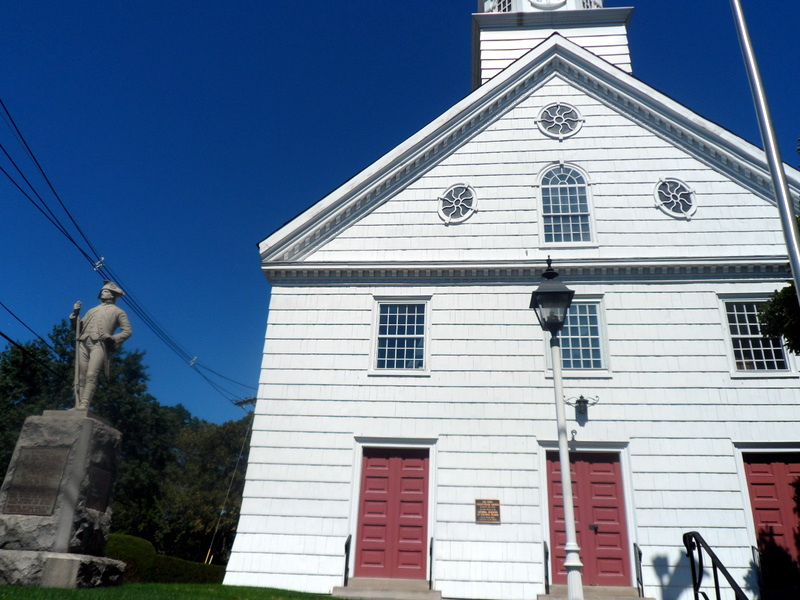
- First Congregation of the Presbyterian Church at Springfield

- Seal

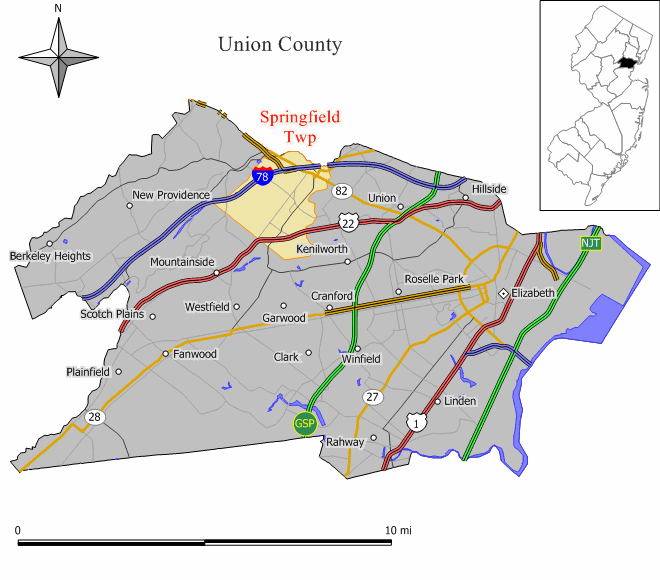
- Map of Springfield Township in Union County. Inset: location of Union County highlighted in the State of New Jersey.

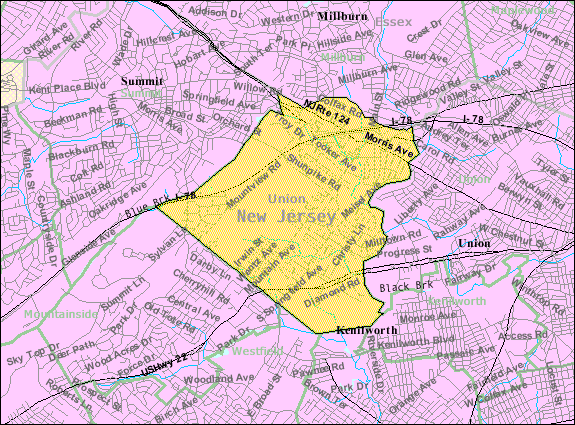
- Census Bureau map of Springfield Township, Union County, New Jersey

- Location in Union County Location in New Jersey Location in the United States
- Coordinates: 40.697966°N 74.334436°W
- Country: United States
- State: New Jersey
- County: Union
- Formed: April 14, 1794
- Incorporated: February 21, 1798

Government
  - Type: Township
  - Body: Township Committee
  - Mayor: Harris Laufer (D, term ends December 31, 2026)
  - Administrator: John Bussiculo
  - Municipal clerk: Linda Donnelly

Area
  - Total: 5.17 sq mi (13.40 km^{2})
  - Land: 5.16 sq mi (13.36 km^{2})
  - Water: 0.015 sq mi (0.04 km^{2}) 0.31%
  - Rank: 272nd of 565 in state 9th of 21 in county
- Elevation: 138 ft (42 m)

Population (2020)
  - Total: 17,178
  - Estimate (2023): 16,846
  - Rank: 155th of 565 in state 12th of 21 in county
  - Density: 3,331/sq mi (1,286/km^{2})
  - Rank: 204th of 565 in state 18th of 21 in county
- Time zone: UTC−05:00 (Eastern (EST))
  - Summer (DST): UTC−04:00 (Eastern (EDT))
- ZIP Code: 07081
- Area codes: 908 and 973
- FIPS code: 3403970020
- GNIS feature ID: 0882213
- Website: springfield-nj.us

Springfield Township is a township in Union County, in the U.S. state of New Jersey. The township is located on a ridge in northern-central New Jersey, within the Raritan Valley and Rahway Valley regions in the New York metropolitan area. As of the 2020 United States census, the township's population was 17,178, the highest recorded at any decennial census, an increase of 1,361 (+8.6%) from the 2010 census count of 15,817, which in turn reflected an increase of 1,388 (+9.6%) from the 14,429 counted in the 2000 census.

Springfield was formed as a township on April 14, 1794, from portions of Elizabeth Township and Newark Township, while the area was still part of Essex County, and was incorporated as one of New Jersey's first 104 townships by an act of the New Jersey Legislature on February 21, 1798. It became part of the newly formed Union County on March 19, 1857, with portions remaining in Essex County used to create Millburn. Other portions of the township have been taken to form New Providence Township (November 8, 1809, now known as Berkeley Heights), Livingston (February 5, 1813), Summit (March 23, 1869) and Cranford (March 14, 1871). The township's name derives from springs and brooks in the area.

The Battle of Springfield was fought here, the last of many battles of the American Revolutionary War to be fought in New Jersey.

Springfield is the home of the Baltusrol Golf Club, which was the host to the 2016 PGA Championship. It has also hosted other golf major championships, including the U.S. Open, held on seven occasions at Baltusrol, most recently in 1993. Golfweek magazine ranked Baltusrol as the 36th best in its 2010 rankings of the "Best Classic Courses" in the country.

New Jersey Monthly magazine ranked Springfield as the 85th best place to live in New Jersey in its 2010 rankings of the "Best Places To Live" in New Jersey.

== History ==
Springfield is celebrated as the site of a Battle of Springfield between the American Continental Army and British forces on June 23, 1780. The British, under Hessian General Wilhelm von Knyphausen, advanced from Elizabethtown about 5 o'clock in the morning. They were opposed by General Nathanael Greene, but owing to the superior number of the enemy he was compelled to evacuate Springfield, which was then burned by the British. During the action the Rev. James Caldwell, chaplain in the New Jersey brigade, is said to have distributed the Watts hymn books from the neighboring Presbyterian Church among the soldiers for wadding, saying at the same time, "Now put Watts into them, boys." This battle prevented further advance on the part of the British. The American loss was about 15 and that of the British about 150.

Some historical landmarks from the Revolution still stand: the Cannon Ball House, which has since been converted into a museum, was (according to the township's official website) "Built circa 1741 and served as a farmhouse at the time of the Revolutionary War. During the Battle of Springfield (June 23, 1780) the British used it as a hospital. ... It was one of only three buildings left standing when all others including the Presbyterian Church where Reverend James Caldwell had taken Watts hymnbooks for rifle wadding, were set on fire. ... In later years the house became a tavern to serve travelers on Morris (Ave) Turnpike. The farmland was later sold off, and it served then as a private residence. The property was acquired by the Springfield Historical Society in 1955. It has become known as The Cannon Ball House because a cannonball was found on the west side embedded in a beam. ... The Cannon Ball House has five revolutionary era rooms, some American Civil War items, early tools, a Battle diorama and a colonial garden. It has just been (1998) renovated to its original appearance and color."

After being burned down by the British, First Presbyterian Church was rebuilt. A statue of a Continental soldier was erected in 1903 at the site of the smallest state park in New Jersey.

== Geography ==
According to the United States Census Bureau, the township had a total area of 5.17 square miles (13.40 km^{2}), including 5.16 square miles (13.36 km^{2}) of land and 0.02 square miles (0.04 km^{2}) of water (0.31%).

The Township of Springfield is located on the northern edge of Union County and is bordered by Millburn to the north in Essex County, by Union Township to the east, by Kenilworth to the southeast, by Westfield and Cranford to the south, by Mountainside to the southwest and by Summit to the northwest.

Unincorporated communities, localities and place names located partially or completely within the township include Baltusrol, Branch Mills and Milltown. Springfield's downtown is a census-designated place.

== Parks and recreation ==
The Rahway River Parkway greenway along the Rahway River runs through the township.

Parks include:

- Briant Park, which crosses into Summit
- Lenape Park, which covers 450 acres (180 ha) and also includes portions of Cranford, Kenilworth, Union Township and Westfield

== Demographics ==
Historical population
Census	Pop.	Note	%±
1810	2,360		—
1820	1,804	*	−23.6%
1830	1,656		−8.2%
1840	1,651		−0.3%
1850	1,945		17.8%
1860	1,020	*	−47.6%
1870	770	*	−24.5%
1880	844	*	9.6%
1890	959		13.6%
1900	1,073		11.9%
1910	1,246		16.1%
1920	1,715		37.6%
1930	3,725		117.2%
1940	4,148		11.4%
1950	7,214		73.9%
1960	14,467		100.5%
1970	15,740		8.8%
1980	13,955		−11.3%
1990	13,420		−3.8%
2000	14,429		7.5%
2010	15,817		9.6%
2020	17,178		8.6%
2023 (est.)	16,846		−1.9%
Population sources: 1810–1920 1840; 1850–1870 1850 1870; 1880–1890 1890–1910 1910–1930; 1940–2000 2000; 2010 2020 * = Lost territory in previous decade.

=== 2020 census ===
Springfield township, Union County, New Jersey – Racial and ethnic composition Note: the US Census treats Hispanic/Latino as an ethnic category. This table excludes Latinos from the racial categories and assigns them to a separate category. Hispanics/Latinos may be of any race.
Race / Ethnicity (NH = Non-Hispanic)	Pop 2000	Pop 2010	Pop 2020	% 2000	% 2010	% 2020
White alone (NH)	12,491	11,922	11,140	86.57%	75.37%	64.85%
Black or African American alone (NH)	536	968	1,504	3.71%	6.12%	8.76%
Native American or Alaska Native alone (NH)	2	8	7	0.01%	0.05%	0.04%
Asian alone (NH)	675	1,196	1,541	4.68%	7.56%	8.97%
Native Hawaiian or Pacific Islander alone (NH)	0	0	1	0.00%	0.00%	0.01%
Other race alone (NH)	18	24	131	0.12%	0.15%	0.76%
Mixed race or Multiracial (NH)	110	197	619	0.76%	1.25%	3.60%
Hispanic or Latino (any race)	597	1,502	2,235	4.14%	9.50%	13.01%
Total	14,429	15,817	17,178	100.00%	100.00%	100.00%

=== 2010 census ===
The 2010 United States census counted 15,817 people, 6,511 households, and 4,265 families in the township. The population density was 3,057.2 per square mile (1,180.4/km^{2}). There were 6,736 housing units at an average density of 1,302.0 per square mile (502.7/km^{2}). The racial makeup was 82.46% (13,042) White, 6.25% (989) Black or African American, 0.06% (10) Native American, 7.70% (1,218) Asian, 0.01% (2) Pacific Islander, 1.75% (277) from other races, and 1.76% (279) from two or more races. Hispanic or Latino of any race were 9.50% (1,502) of the population.

Of the 6,511 households, 29.0% had children under the age of 18; 53.6% were married couples living together; 8.9% had a female householder with no husband present and 34.5% were non-families. Of all households, 29.6% were made up of individuals and 14.0% had someone living alone who was 65 years of age or older. The average household size was 2.43 and the average family size was 3.05.

21.1% of the population were under the age of 18, 5.7% from 18 to 24, 26.4% from 25 to 44, 29.3% from 45 to 64, and 17.5% who were 65 years of age or older. The median age was 42.9 years. For every 100 females, the population had 88.8 males. For every 100 females ages 18 and older there were 84.7 males.

The Census Bureau's 2006–2010 American Community Survey showed that (in 2010 inflation-adjusted dollars) median household income was $84,038 (with a margin of error of +/− $8,139) and the median family income was $111,359 (+/− $8,121). Males had a median income of $74,335 (+/− $7,959) versus $62,859 (+/− $6,250) for females. The per capita income for the township was $46,393 (+/− $3,175). About 2.9% of families and 6.0% of the population were below the poverty line, including 1.9% of those under age 18 and 5.6% of those age 65 or over.

=== 2000 census ===
As of the 2000 United States census there were 14,429 people, 6,001 households, and 4,014 families residing in the township. The population density was 2,801.8 inhabitants per square mile (1,081.8/km^{2}). There were 6,204 housing units at an average density of 1,204.7 per square mile (465.1/km^{2}). The racial makeup of the township was 89.72% White, 3.72% African American, 0.02% Native American, 4.69% Asian, 0.96% from other races, and 0.89% from two or more races. Hispanic or Latino people of any race were 4.14% of the population.

There were 6,001 households, out of which 27.0% had children under the age of 18 living with them, 56.9% were married couples living together, 7.3% had a female householder with no husband present, and 33.1% were non-families. 28.7% of all households were made up of individuals, and 14.7% had someone living alone who was 65 years of age or older. The average household size was 2.40 and the average family size was 2.98.

In the township the population was spread out, with 20.6% under the age of 18, 4.7% from 18 to 24, 29.4% from 25 to 44, 24.7% from 45 to 64, and 20.6% who were 65 years of age or older. The median age was 42 years. For every 100 females, there were 89.3 males. For every 100 females age 18 and over, there were 86.0 males.

The median income for a household in the township was $73,790, and the median income for a family was $85,725. Males had a median income of $55,907 versus $39,542 for females. The per capita income for the township was $36,754. About 1.8% of families and 3.1% of the population were below the poverty line, including 1.0% of those under age 18 and 5.8% of those age 65 or over.

== Government ==
=== Local government ===
The Township of Springfield is governed under the Township form of New Jersey municipal government, one of 141 municipalities (of the 564) statewide that use this form, the second-most commonly used form of government in the state. The Township Committee is comprised of five members, who are elected directly by the voters at-large in partisan elections to serve three-year terms of office on a staggered basis, with either one or two seats coming up for election each year as part of the November general election in a three-year cycle. At an annual reorganization meeting, usually held on the first day of January, the committee selects one of its members to serve as Mayor and another as Deputy Mayor.

As of 2026, Springfield Township Committee members are Mayor Harris Laufer (D, term on committee ends 2028; term as mayor ends December 31, 2026), Deputy Mayor Alexander Keiser (D, 2027), Christopher Capodice (D, 2026), Richard Huber (D, 2028) and Christopher Weber (D, 2027).

In the November 2012 general election, voters approved the formation of a Charter Study Commission that would consider the possibility of changing the existing township form of government and may recommend changing to one the forms available under the Faulkner Act (mayor-council, council-manager, small municipality or mayor-council-administrator), one of the other available forms or to leave the form of government unchanged.

=== Federal, state and county representation ===
Springfield Township is located in the 7th Congressional District and is part of New Jersey's 21st state legislative district.

For the 119th United States Congress, New Jersey's 7th congressional district is represented by Thomas Kean Jr. (R, Westfield). New Jersey is represented in the United States Senate by Democrats Cory Booker (Newark, term ends 2027) and Andy Kim (Moorestown, term ends 2031).

For the 2026–2027 session, the 21st legislative district of the New Jersey Legislature is represented in the State Senate by Jon Bramnick (R, Westfield) and in the General Assembly by Vincent Kearney (D, Garwood) and Andrew Macurdy (D, Summit).

Union County is governed by a Board of County Commissioners, whose nine members are elected at-large to three-year terms of office on a staggered basis with three seats coming up for election each year, with an appointed County Manager overseeing the day-to-day operations of the county. At an annual reorganization meeting held in the beginning of January, the board selects a Chair and Vice Chair from among its members. As of 2026, Union County's County Commissioners are:

Vice Chair Rebecca Williams (D, Plainfield, 2028), Chairman Joesph Bodek (D, Linden, 2026), James E. Baker Jr. (D, Rahway, 2027), Michele Delisfort (D, Union Township, 2026), Lourdes M. Leon (D, Elizabeth, 2026), Alexander Mirabella (D, Fanwood, 2027) Kimberly Palmieri-Mouded (D, Westfield, 2027). Stanley J. Neron (D, Elizabeth, 2028), Joseph Signorello III (D, Roselle Park, 2028)

Constitutional officers elected on a countywide basis are: Clerk Vacant - Incumbent Clerk Joanne Rajoppi (D, Union Township) died on July 16, 2026. Her death triggered a special election for a full five-year term to be held concurrently with the November 2026 general election. Deputy Clerk Clara Fernández assumes the powers of the office until the vacancy is filled. Sheriff Peter Corvelli (D, Kenilworth, 2026) and Surrogate Christopher E. Hudak (D, Clark, 2027).

=== Politics ===
As of March 2011, there were a total of 10,078 registered voters in Springfield Township, of which 3,271 (32.5% vs. 41.8% countywide) were registered as Democrats, 1,795 (17.8% vs. 15.3%) were registered as Republicans and 5,007 (49.7% vs. 42.9%) were registered as Unaffiliated. There were 5 voters registered as Libertarians or Greens. Among the township's 2010 Census population, 63.7% (vs. 53.3% in Union County) were registered to vote, including 80.7% of those ages 18 and over (vs. 70.6% countywide).

Gubernatorial election results for Springfield Township
Year	Republican		Democratic		Third party(ies)	
Year	No.	%	No.	%	No.	%
2025	2,955	38.84%	4,622	60.75%	31	0.41%
2021	2,424	41.73%	3,322	57.19%	63	1.08%
2017	1,830	38.40%	2,849	59.78%	87	1.83%
2013	2,624	56.99%	1,921	41.72%	59	1.28%
2009	2,477	46.64%	2,447	46.07%	387	7.29%
2005	2,047	39.40%	3,043	58.56%	106	2.04%

In the 2012 presidential election, Democrat Barack Obama received 4,083 votes (55.3% vs. 66.0% countywide), ahead of Republican Mitt Romney with 3,179 votes (43.0% vs. 32.3%) and other candidates with 63 votes (0.9% vs. 0.8%), among the 7,388 ballots cast by the township's 10,772 registered voters, for a turnout of 68.6% (vs. 68.8% in Union County). In the 2008 presidential election, Democrat Barack Obama received 4,328 votes (53.9% vs. 63.1% countywide), ahead of Republican John McCain with 3,548 votes (44.2% vs. 35.2%) and other candidates with 82 votes (1.0% vs. 0.9%), among the 8,033 ballots cast by the township's 10,379 registered voters, for a turnout of 77.4% (vs. 74.7% in Union County). In the 2004 presidential election, Democrat John Kerry received 4,246 votes (55.1% vs. 58.3% countywide), ahead of Republican George W. Bush with 3,372 votes (43.8% vs. 40.3%) and other candidates with 49 votes (0.6% vs. 0.7%), among the 7,703 ballots cast by the township's 9,885 registered voters, for a turnout of 77.9% (vs. 72.3% in the whole county).

United States presidential election results for Springfield Township
Year	Republican		Democratic		Third party(ies)	
Year	No.	%	No.	%	No.	%
2024	3,961	41.77%	5,353	56.45%	168	1.77%
2020	3,710	37.71%	6,006	61.05%	122	1.24%
2016	3,241	39.11%	4,801	57.94%	244	2.94%
2012	3,179	43.40%	4,083	55.74%	63	0.86%
2008	3,548	44.58%	4,328	54.39%	82	1.03%
2004	3,372	43.98%	4,246	55.38%	49	0.64%

In the 2017 gubernatorial election, Democrat Phil Murphy received 2,849 votes (59.8% vs. 65.2% countywide), ahead of Republican Kim Guadagno with 1,830 votes (38.4% vs. 32.6%), and other candidates with 87 votes (1.8% vs. 2.1%), among the 4,886 ballots cast by the township's 11,737 registered voters, for a turnout of 41.6%. In the 2013 gubernatorial election, Republican Chris Christie received 57.0% of the vote (2,624 cast), ahead of Democrat Barbara Buono with 41.7% (1,921 votes), and other candidates with 1.3% (59 votes), among the 4,723 ballots cast by the township's 10,771 registered voters (119 ballots were spoiled), for a turnout of 43.8%. In the 2009 gubernatorial election, Republican Chris Christie received 2,477 votes (46.0% vs. 41.7% countywide), ahead of Democrat Jon Corzine with 2,447 votes (45.5% vs. 50.6%), Independent Chris Daggett with 359 votes (6.7% vs. 5.9%) and other candidates with 28 votes (0.5% vs. 0.8%), among the 5,380 ballots cast by the township's 10,214 registered voters, yielding a 52.7% turnout (vs. 46.5% in the county).

United States Senate election results for Springfield Township1
Year	Republican		Democratic		Third party(ies)	
Year	No.	%	No.	%	No.	%
2024	3,599	40.04%	5,203	57.89%	186	2.07%
2018	2,511	40.34%	3,430	55.10%	284	4.56%
2012	2,667	39.85%	3,902	58.30%	124	1.85%
2006	2,176	42.79%	2,830	55.65%	79	1.55%

United States Senate election results for Springfield Township2
Year	Republican		Democratic		Third party(ies)	
Year	No.	%	No.	%	No.	%
2020	3,687	37.91%	5,878	60.44%	161	1.66%
2014	1,708	40.08%	2,482	58.24%	72	1.69%
2013	1,221	40.92%	1,740	58.31%	23	0.77%
2008	2,989	41.83%	4,024	56.32%	132	1.85%

== Education ==
The Springfield Public Schools serve students in pre-kindergarten through twelfth grade. As of the 2022–23 school year, the district, comprised of five schools, had an enrollment of 2,236 students and 168.3 classroom teachers (on an FTE basis), for a student–teacher ratio of 13.3:1. All of the township's schools are named after notable Springfieldians. For instance, the township's high school is named after Jonathan Dayton, a signer of the United States Constitution. Schools in the district (with 2022–23 enrollment data from the National Center for Education Statistics) are Edward V. Walton Early Childhood Center with 551 students in grades PreK-2, James Caldwell Elementary School with 292 students in grades 3-5, Thelma L. Sandmeier Elementary School with 245 students in grades 3-5, Florence M. Gaudineer Middle School with 518 students in grades 6-8 and Jonathan Dayton High School with 659 students in grades 9-12.

Adjacent to Florence M. Gaudineer Middle School was Saint James the Apostle School, a Catholic school opened in 1952 that served students in pre-kindergarten through eighth grades until it closed in 2020. An adaptive reuse of the building for the Winston School, a specialized school for students with learning disabilities, was approved in August 2025.

== Transportation ==
=== Roads and highways ===
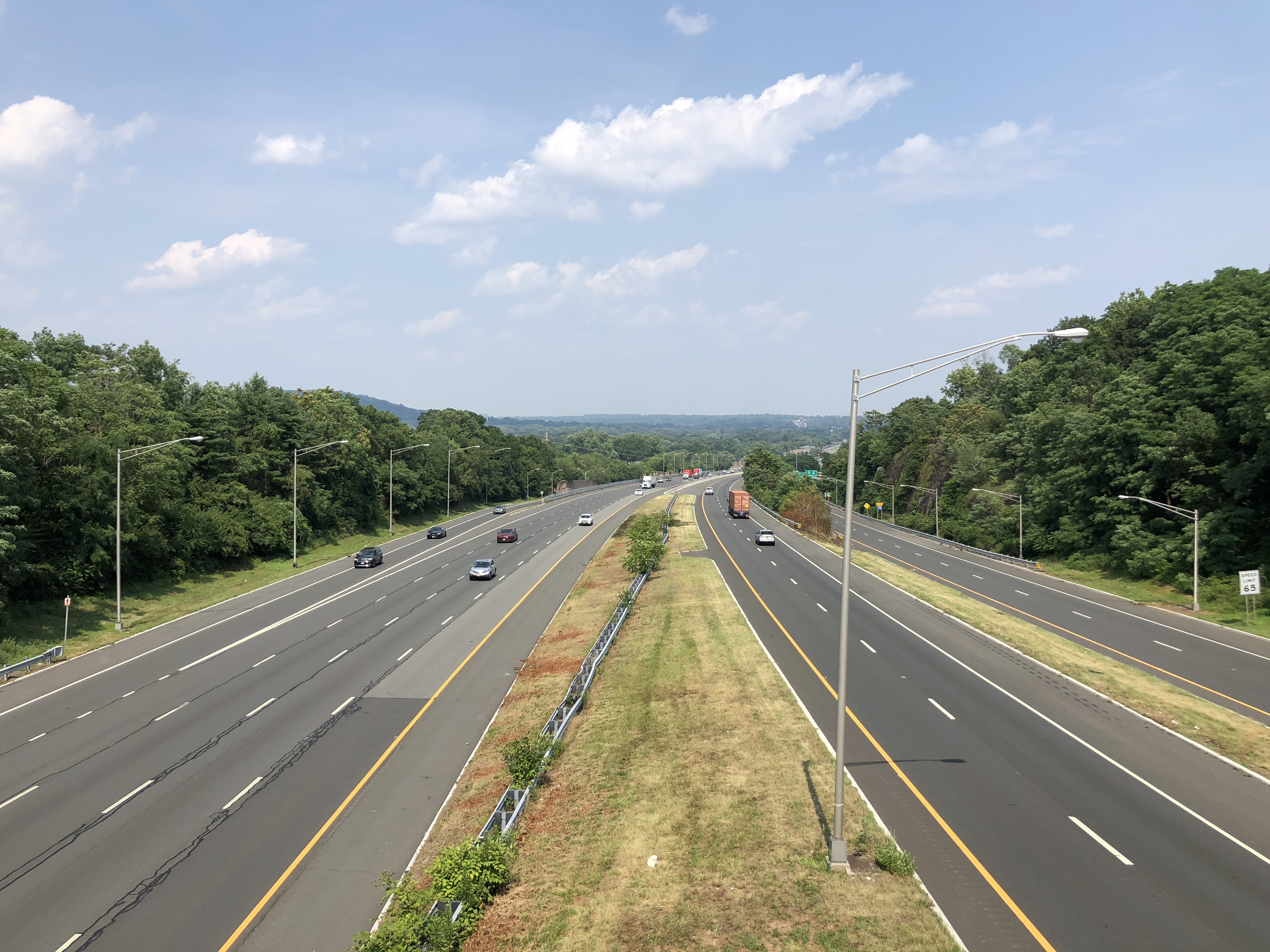
Interstate 78 eastbound in Springfield Township

As of May 2010, the township had a total of 56.53 miles (90.98 km) of roadways, of which 39.82 miles (64.08 km) were maintained by the municipality, 8.63 miles (13.89 km) by Union County and 8.08 miles (13.00 km) by the New Jersey Department of Transportation.

Interstate 78, U.S. Route 22, Route 24 and Route 124, as well as CR 509 Spur and CR 577, are among the highways and roadways that pass through Springfield Township.

=== Public transportation ===
NJ Transit provides bus service to the Port Authority Bus Terminal in Midtown Manhattan in New York City and to points in New Jersey including Newark Penn Station. Parking is available for a fee at a municipal lot near the center of town (Hannah Street and Center Street) and in the Duffy's Corner lot at Morris and Caldwell Place, which provide easy access to all NJ Transit buses that run through town. Annual permits are available from the town hall.

Although there is no train station in Springfield, the Millburn and Short Hills NJ Transit stations are located nearby, though neither allows commuter-hour parking for non-residents. The closest stations that allow out-of-town residents access to parking are Maplewood and Summit. The 70 bus provides access from the center of town to NJ Transit's Summit and Millburn stations; Eastbound it terminates at NJ Transit's Newark Penn Station with connections to Amtrak, NJ Transit trains to New York Penn Station, and Port Authority Trans-Hudson (PATH) trains. The township also runs a jitney that operates on weekdays during morning and evening rush hours from the community pool to NJ Transit's Short Hills station. NJ Transit buses 65, 66 and 70 (to Newark), the 114 (to Midtown Manhattan's Port Authority Bus Terminal) and local service on the 52 route also run along the town's major roadways. Bus #114 runs at a frequency of 2-3 buses per hour during rush hour and 1 per hour outside of rush hour.

Newark Liberty International Airport is approximately 10 miles (16 km) east of Springfield, putting hundreds of direct international and national flights within a 20 min reach of the town's residents.

=== Historical transportation ===
The Rahway Valley Railroad passed through the community, and during the early 20th century offered both freight and passenger service, but is currently out of service. The section of the railway that extended from Springfield to Summit was taken out of service in 1976, though special trains were operated to provide service to Baltusrol during the 1980 U.S. Open.

A trolley line called the Morris County Traction Company, ran trolley service through Springfield to/from Newark and Morris County, in the early part of the 20th century.

== Notable people ==
People who were born in, residents of, or otherwise closely associated with Springfield Township include:

- Dan Avidan (born 1979), lead singer-songwriter of Ninja Sex Party, Shadow Academy and Starbomb; co-host of web series Game Grumps
- Roy Belliveau (born 1929), former professional basketball player who played in the American Basketball League and Eastern Professional Basketball League
- Lou Campanelli (1938–2023), basketball coach
- William A. Chatfield (born 1951), government executive and lobbyist who served as the 11th Director of the Selective Service System, from 2004 to 2009
- Anthony Cioffi (born 1994), football safety; played college football for Rutgers University and was signed by the Oakland Raiders
- Jonas Coe (1805–1864), naval commander in Argentina and Uruguay
- Jon Denning (born 1987), NASCAR driver
- Jeannette DePalma (1956–1972), murder victim found in Houdaille Quarry whose unsolved case has become a matter of significant controversy thanks in part to coverage in Weird NJ magazine
- Ina Drew, former Chief Investment Officer at JP Morgan Chase who resigned following the 2012 JPMorgan Chase trading loss that resulted in billions in losses to the bank
- George A. Halsey (1827–1894), politician; represented New Jersey's 5th congressional district in Congress 1867–1869 and 1871–1873
- Toni Kalem (born 1951), actress, screenwriter and director; best known for her portrayal of Angie Bonpensiero on the HBO series The Sopranos
- Louis Keller (1857–1922), publisher, social arbiter of high society and golf club owner, best known as the founder of the Baltusrol Golf Club and as the first publisher of the Social Register
- Donald Lan (1930–2019), politician; Secretary of State of New Jersey, 1977–1982
- George Low Jr. (1912–1995), professional golfer; better known as a putting instructor and hustler
- George Low Sr. (1874–1950), Scottish-American professional golfer who finished tied for second place in the 1899 U.S. Open championship
- Dina Matos (born 1966), former First Lady of New Jersey
- Gail J. McGovern (born 1952), businessperson who has served as president and CEO of the American Red Cross
- Mark Melni, pianist and inventor
- Curt Merz (1938–2022), professional American football guard who played seven seasons in the American Football League for the Kansas City Chiefs
- Jackie Nese (born 1997), singer/songwriter, dancer, actor, who was a contestant on American Idol in 2015
- Dylan O'Brien (born 1991), actor
- Bernard Purdie (born 1941), prolific session drummer
- Claudio Reyna (born 1973), professional soccer player
- Jeff Ross (born 1965 as Jeffrey Ross Lifschultz), comedian
- George Erik Rupp (born 1942), former president of Rice University and Columbia University; has headed the International Rescue Committee since 2002
- Gabe Saporta (born 1979), lead singer and primary creative force behind the band Cobra Starship
- Joe Schaffernoth (1937–2016), pitcher who played for the Chicago Cubs and Cleveland Indians
- Barbara Tropp (1948–2001), chef and cookery writer who helped introduce Americans to Chinese cuisine
- Zygi Wilf (born 1950), owner of the Minnesota Vikings
- James Yee (born 1968), former United States Army chaplain with the rank of captain; best known for being subject to an intense investigation by the United States, but all charges were later dropped
