= Toni Kalem =

American actress

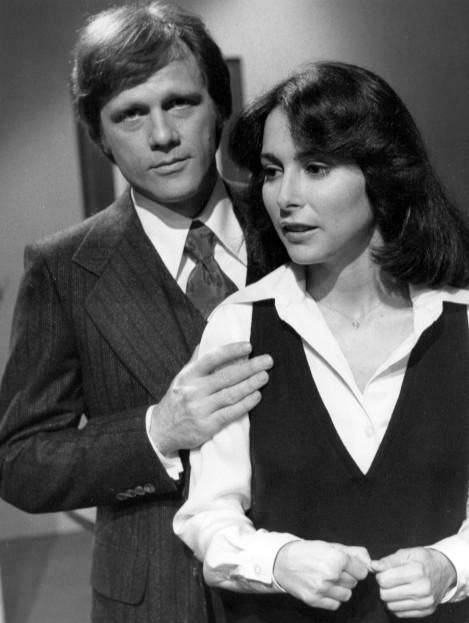
- Toni Kalem as Angie Perrini with Leon Russom as Willis Frame in Another World, in 1976.
- Born: Toni Z. Kalem; August 29, 1956 (age 69); Springfield, New Jersey, U.S.
- Occupation: Actress
- Years active: 1973–present

Toni Z. Kalem (born August 29, 1956) is an American actress. Kalem is best known for her portrayal of Angie Bonpensiero on the HBO series The Sopranos.

Kalem grew up in Springfield Township, Union County, New Jersey. She appeared in such films as Double Jeopardy, Private Benjamin, Sister Act, The Wanderers, Eyes of the Beholder, Silent Rage and The Boy Who Drank Too Much. Her television credits include guest appearances on Starsky and Hutch, MacGyver, Another World and Police Woman. During the sixth season of The Sopranos, Kalem was elevated from guest star to series regular for her character Angie Bonpensiero, the widow of Sal "Big Pussy" Bonpensiero who runs a body shop in partnership with Tony Soprano.

In 1999, Kalem wrote and directed the film A Slipping Down Life. In 2004, she wrote the fifty-sixth episode for The Sopranos, called "All Happy Families..."

== Filmography ==
Film
| Year | Film | Role | Other notes |
|---|---|---|---|
| 1979 | The Wanderers | Despie Galasso | |
| 1980 | Private Benjamin | Private Gianelli | |
| 1981 | Paternity | Diane Cassabello | |
| 1982 | Love | Girl | Segment: For Life |
| 1982 | I'm Dancing as Fast as I Can | Debby | |
| 1982 | Silent Rage | Alison Halman | |
| 1983 | Two of a Kind | Terri | |
| 1984 | Reckless | Donna | |
| 1986 | Billy Galvin | Nora | |
| 1992 | Sister Act | Connie LaRocca | |
| 1992 | Eyes of the Beholder | Dr. Gruber | |
| 1996 | American Strays | Alice | |
| 2001 | 15 Minutes | Woman At Planet Hollywood | |
Television
| Year | Title | Role | Notes |
| 1974 | Dominic's Dream | Marie Bente | TV-Movie |
| 1977 | Kojak | Nora | 1 episode |
| 1977 | Baretta | Bobbie | 1 episode |
| 1977 | Starsky and Hutch | Molly Bristol | 1 episode |
| 1977 | Police Woman | Melinda Ventselos | 1 episode |
| 1977–1979 | Another World | Angela 'Angie' Perrini Frame #1 | unknown episodes |
| 1978 | What Really Happened to the Class of '65? | Juana | 1 episode |
| 1980 | The Boy Who Drank Too Much | Tina | TV-Movie |
| 1981 | ABC Afterschool Special | Samantha Anderson | 1 episode |
| 1981 | Splendor in the Grass | Angelina | TV-Movie |
| 1981–1984 | Trapper John, M.D. | Bobbi Dugan / Terry Manzari / Louise Windom | 3 episodes |
| 1983 | The American Snitch | Holly | TV-Movie |
| 1983 | Running Out | Shelley | TV-Movie |
| 1985 | Badge of the Assassin | Diana Piagentini | TV-Movie |
| 1986 | Comedy Factory | Ellen Nance | 1 episode |
| 1987 | MacGyver | Elaine Harryman | 1 episode |
| 1987 | The Equalizer | Sarah | Episode: "Inner View" |
| 1990 | The Marshall Chronicles | English Teacher | 2 episodes |
| 1991 | Veronica Clare | Unknown | 1 episode |
| 1992 | Picket Fences | Nicole Ledeux | 1 episode |
| 1993 | The Odd Couple Together Again | Edna | TV-Movie |
| 1996 | Double Jeopardy | Sue Schilling | TV-Movie |
| 1997 | Beyond Belief: Fact or Fiction | Mona | 1 episode |
| 2000–2006 | The Sopranos | Angie Bonpensiero | 12 episodes |

== Awards and nominations ==
Sundance Film Festival

- 1999: Nominated, "Grand Jury Prize for Most Dramatic Film" – A Slipping-Down Life
