= Jackie Nese =

American singer

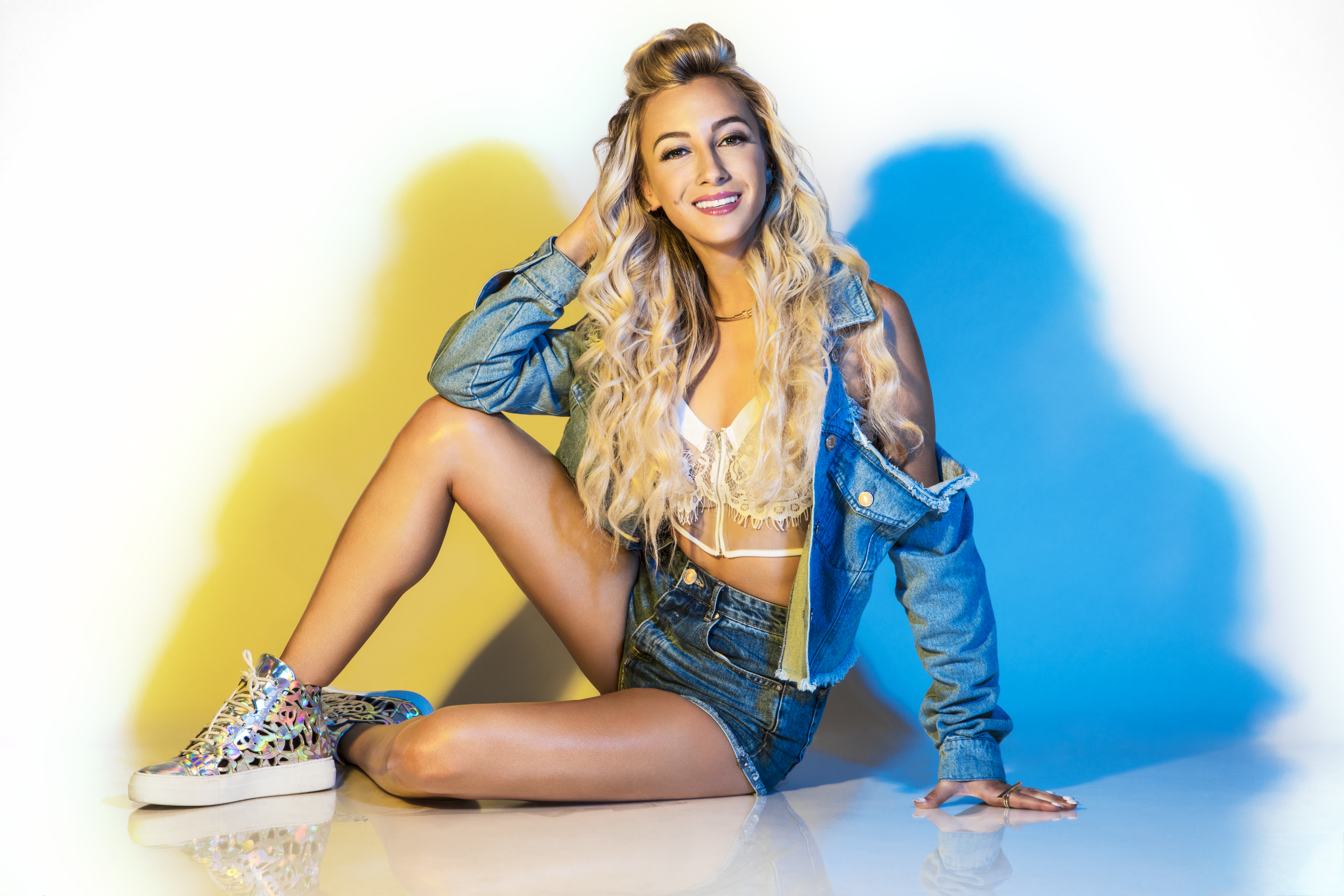

Background information
- Born: January 17, 1997 (age 28); Springfield Township, Union County, New Jersey, U.S.
- Occupation: Singer
- Years active: 2015–present
- Website: jackienese.com

Jacquelyn Nese (born January 17, 1997) is an American singer who was a contestant on American Idol in 2015. Her debut single titled "Lovin' Me Up" was released in 2017 along with the music video. The song was produced by Jimmy Greco and Russ DeSalvo.

== Early life and education ==
Nese was born on January 17, 1997, in Springfield Township, Union County, New Jersey. She is currently studying at Montclair State University.
