= The Family Holvak =

American television series

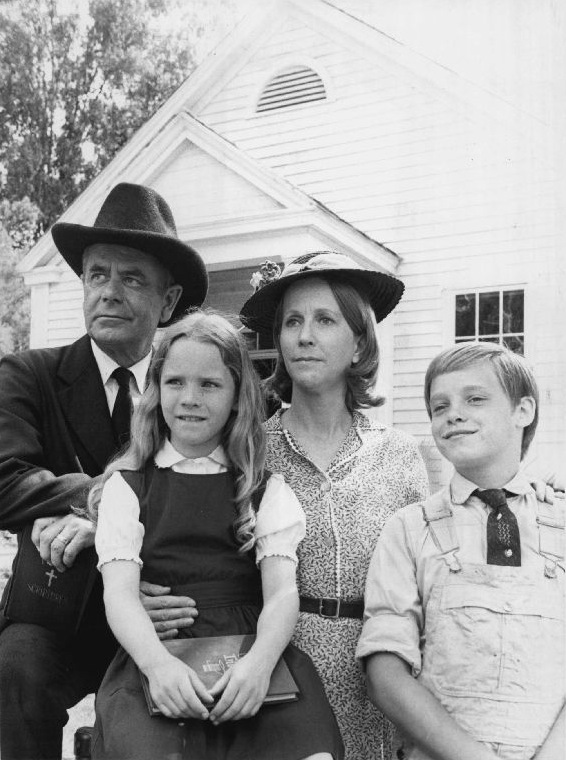
- Genre: Drama
- Based on: The Greatest Gift
- Directed by: Ralph Senensky; George Sherman
- Starring: Glenn Ford; Julie Harris; Lance Kerwin; Elizabeth Cheshire; Ted Gehring
- Country of origin: United States
- Original language: English
- No. of seasons: 1
- No. of episodes: 10

Production
- Production company: Universal Television

Original release
- Network: NBC
- Release: September 7 – December 28, 1975

Related
- The Greatest Gift

The Family Holvak is a 1975 American television series. The television film The Greatest Gift was the pilot for this series.

== Plot ==
Tom Holvak, a small town minister in Bensfield, Tennessee, struggles to keep his family afloat and maintain his congregation's faith during the Great Depression.

== Episodes ==
No.	Title	Original release date
1	"The Long Way Home: Part 1"	September 7, 1975
2	"The Long Way Home: Part 2"	September 14, 1975
3	"A Stranger in a Strange Land"	September 21, 1975
4	"Remembrance of a Guest"	September 28, 1975
5	"First Love: Part 1"	October 5, 1975
6	"First Love: Part 2"	October 12, 1975
7	"Willing Heart"	October 19, 1975
8	"The Devil's Chariot"	October 26, 1975
9	"The Tribute"	December 21, 1975
10	"The Wedding"	December 28, 1975

== Television Movies ==
In 1975 Universal Television produced two television films from four episodes of the series. During the 10-episode run of the series. there were two episodes which contained both part 1 and 2 of the episode. The first movie "Long Way Home" is a compilation of episodes 1 and 2 with the original title of "The Long Way Home". The second movie "My Love" is a compilation of episodes 5 and 6 with the original title of "First Love".

Although it is unclear when and where these movies originally aired, the Trinity Broadcast Network (TBN) aired both movies. They are available for viewing on YouTube along with the original 1974 television film The Greatest Gift which served as the pilot for the 1975 series.
