= Marion Ross =

American actress (born 1928)

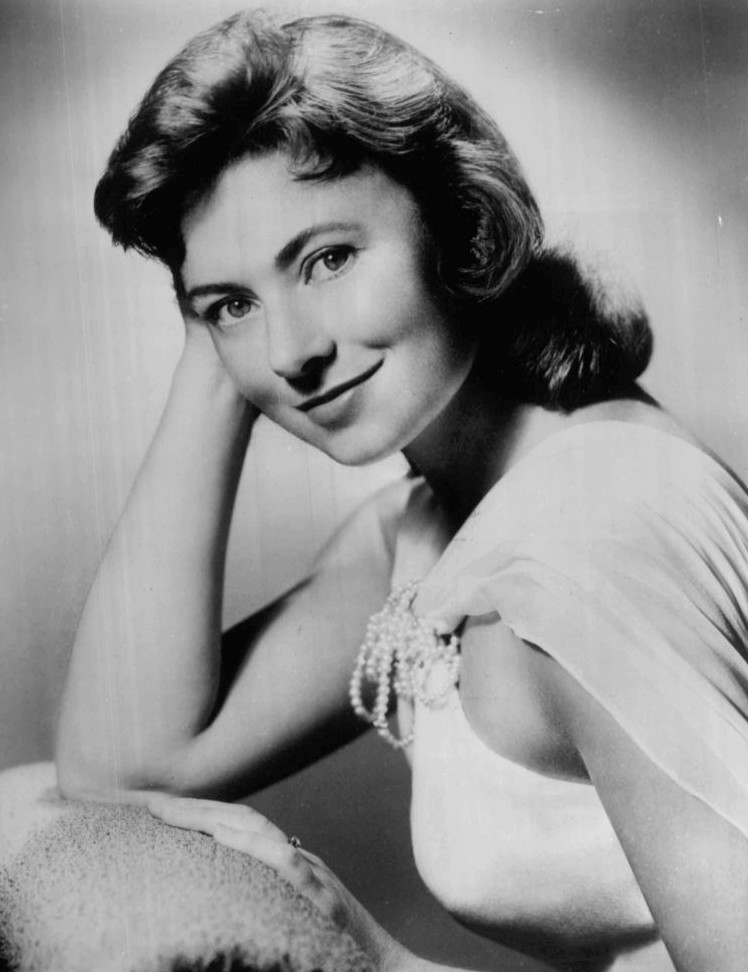
- Ross in 1961
- Born: Marian Ellen Ross; October 25, 1928 (age 98); Watertown, Minnesota, U.S.
- Education: Point Loma High School, San Diego State University
- Occupation: Actress
- Years active: 1953–2021
- Known for: Happy Days; The Evening Star; The Glenn Miller Story
- Spouses: Freeman Meskimen (m. 1951; div. 1969); Paul Michael (m. 1988; died 2011)
- Children: 2, including Jim Meskimen

Marion Ross (born Marian Ellen Ross; October 25, 1928) is an American actress. Her best-known role is that of Marion Cunningham on the ABC television sitcom Happy Days, on which she starred from 1974 to 1984 and for which she received two Primetime Emmy Award nominations. Before her success on Happy Days, Ross appeared in a variety of film roles, appearing in The Glenn Miller Story (1954), Sabrina (1954), Lust for Life (1956), Teacher's Pet (1958), Some Came Running (1958), Operation Petticoat (1959), and Honky (1971), as well as several minor television roles, one of which was on television's The Lone Ranger (1954), and The Outer Limits (1964). She was also twice nominated successively in 1992 and 1993 for the Primetime Emmy Award for her performance on the CBS television comedy-drama Brooklyn Bridge and later netted another Emmy nomination (her fifth and latest) in 1999 for a two-episode appearance on the CBS drama Touched by an Angel. Ross also co-starred in a sequel to the film Terms of Endearment (1983) called The Evening Star (1996), for which she was nominated for the Golden Globe Award for Best Supporting Actress. She was also nominated and won a Lone Star Film and Television Award for Best Supporting Actress.

In the 1990s, Ross did some voiceover work, voicing on animated television series such as King of the Hill and SpongeBob SquarePants, among others, and appearing in recurring roles on shows such as The Drew Carey Show, Gilmore Girls, and Brothers & Sisters.

== Early life ==
Marian Ellen Ross was born on October 25, 1928 in Watertown, Minnesota, the middle child of Gordon and Ellen Alicia (née Hamilton) Ross, natives of Saskatchewan, Canada. She had an elder sister, Alicia, and a younger brother, Gordon. She lived in Waconia, then moved to Willmar, and eventually to Albert Lea, Minnesota.

At the age of 13, she changed the spelling of her name from "Marian" to "Marion", as she thought it had a "more pleasing appearance" and would look better on a theatrical program and a theater's marquee. After completing her sophomore year in high school, she moved to Minneapolis, studying drama at the MacPhail Center for Music and attending Southwest High School. A year later, her family moved to San Diego, California when she was 16 years old. She graduated from Point Loma High School in San Diego. She earned her undergraduate degree from San Diego State University.

== Career ==
=== Early film and television roles: 1953–1973 ===
Ross made her 1953 film debut in Forever Female, starring Ginger Rogers and William Holden. She found steady work in film, appearing in The Glenn Miller Story (1954), Sabrina (1954), Lust for Life (1956), Lizzie (1957), Teacher's Pet (1958), Some Came Running (1958), and Operation Petticoat (1959). She also appeared in Colossus: The Forbin Project (1970), Honky (1971), and Grand Theft Auto (1977).

Ross' career on television also began in 1953, when she played the Irish maid on the series Life with Father for two years. In 1954, she appeared as Ginny Thorpe on The Lone Ranger, and in 1958, she appeared on NBC's Mickey Spillane's Mike Hammer as Mary Williams. In 1959, she appeared as a teacher Miss McGinnis on ABC's The Donna Reed Show. She appeared on The George Burns and Gracie Allen Show, The Millionaire (1956 episode), Steve Canyon, Perry Mason (The Case of the Romantic Rogue), Buckskin, The Barbara Stanwyck Show, Father Knows Best, The Outer Limits (The Special One), Thriller (The Prisoner in the Mirror), The Brothers Brannagan (two episodes as Diane Warren), The Eleventh Hour, Mannix, Route 66, Mr. Novak, Death Valley Days, Hawaii Five-O, The Brady Bunch, The Fugitive, and Night Court.

In the 1961–62 television season, she played Gertrude Berg's daughter on the CBS sitcom Mrs. G. Goes to College as well as starred as a mail order bride on Rawhide. Ross had an uncredited and non-speaking role as one of the hapless passengers on board Trans Global Flight #2 in Airport (1970). In 1970, she also played a computer scientist in the sci-fi thriller Colossus: The Forbin Project.

=== Happy Days success and roles thereafter: 1974–1995 ===
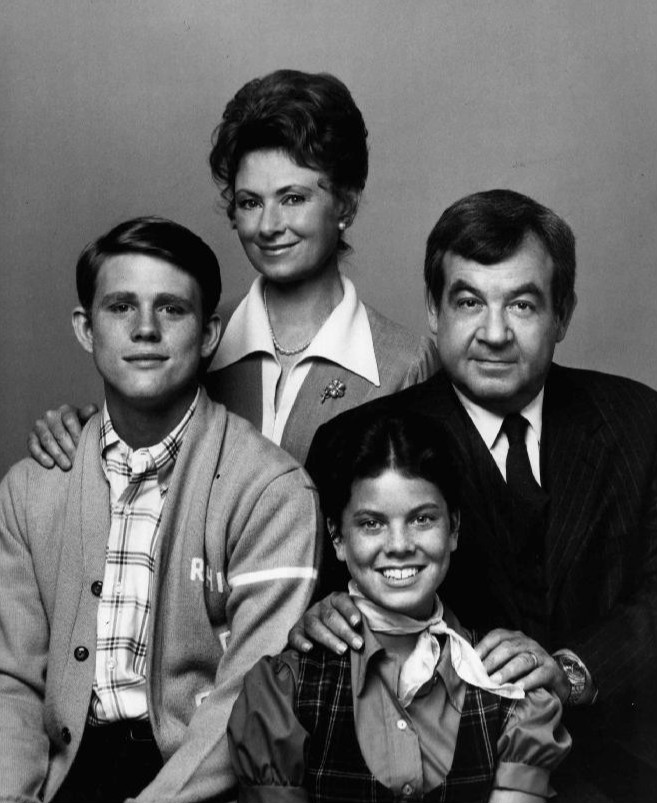
Happy Days press photo, 1974

Ross' best known role is on the sitcom Happy Days, which aired for 11 seasons on ABC from 1974 to 1984. She portrayed matriarch Marion Cunningham, mother of Richie, Joanie and (briefly) Chuck, appearing in all but two episodes of the entire series. She received Primetime Emmy Award nominations for her work on the show in 1979 and 1984. Ross later reprised Marion Cunningham on the spin-off series Joanie Loves Chachi and on Family Guy. Between 1978 and 1986, she appeared as different characters on The Love Boat. In the final (#9) 1986–87 television season, Ross became a series regular, playing Emily Haywood, who was the love interest of Captain Stubing, played by Gavin MacLeod. She later starred in the comedy-drama Brooklyn Bridge, which ran on CBS from 1991 to 1993. Ross also appeared on the game show Password Plus in 1979.

For the summer of 1986, immediately following the finale of The Love Boat, Ross spent the summer touring in a production of Never Too Late, and in a nod to The Love Boat, Ross was cast opposite Gavin MacLeod who played her husband in the recent finale of the TV show and again in the play. In August of that summer the play was presented at Denver's historic Elitch Theatre.

=== Recent roles: 1996–present ===
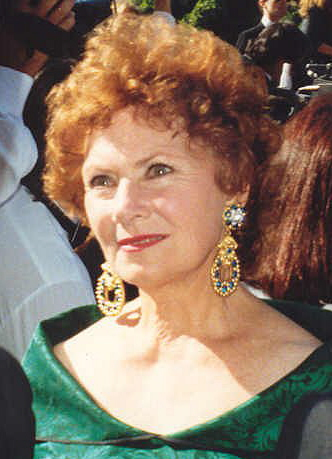
Ross at the 1992 Emmy Awards

In 1996, Ross starred as housekeeper Rosie Dunlop (played originally by Betty R. King in the preceding 1983 film), opposite Shirley MacLaine in The Evening Star, a sequel to Terms of Endearment. Despite panning the film, New York Times critic Janet Maslin enthused that, "Marion Ross does a warm, sturdy job as the devoted housekeeper who has been kept too long under Aurora's wing." She was nominated for a 1997 Golden Globe Award for Best Supporting Actress for her performance, as well as going on to win the 1997 Lone Star Film and Television Award for Best Supporting Actress for that very same turn.

Ross had a recurring role on Touched by an Angel as a homeless woman and was in the final two episodes of the series. Additionally, she played a secretly ill mother in "The Cat", an episode of Early Edition that first aired in April 1997. She had recurring roles as Drew Carey's mother on The Drew Carey Show (during one episode of which she was referred to as her Happy Days character Mrs. Cunningham, a deliberate error for a contest the show was running); as mean grandmother Bernice Forman on That '70s Show; and as Lorelai "Trix" Gilmore and Marilyn Gilmore on Gilmore Girls. She also frequently appeared on Hollywood Squares. During the 1990s, Ross became active in voice-over work. She voiced Grandma SquarePants on Nickelodeon's SpongeBob SquarePants, and Mrs. Lopart on Handy Manny. She also guest-starred on The Sylvester & Tweety Mysteries, The Wild Thornberrys, Generator Rex, and King of the Hill.

In 2007, Ross appeared in Music Within. In 2007 and 2010, she played Ida Holden on ABC's Brothers & Sisters. In June 2008, the Albert Lea Civic Theater in Albert Lea, Minnesota, changed its name to the Marion Ross Performing Arts Center. That year, Ross played Aunt Lucille in the film Superhero Movie, and in 2009 she appeared in a guest spot on The New Adventures of Old Christine.

In 2010, Ross guest-starred on Nurse Jackie and Grey's Anatomy, and appeared in the Cartoon Network television film Scooby-Doo! Curse of the Lake Monster as Mrs. Trowburg. In 2013, she guest-starred on both Major Crimes and The Middle, and in 2014 on Two and a Half Men. In September 2015, she began making brief appearances on MeTV to share her memories of her Happy Days co-stars. In 2020, Ross played Mrs. Genzinger in the Hallmark Christmas television movie Signed Sealed Delivered For Christmas. In 2021, Ross retired from acting, but continued to make several small appearances in various online projects. In 2024, she returned to SpongeBob SquarePants, reprising her role as Grandma SquarePants in the season 14 episode "Don't Make Me Laugh".

== Happy Days lawsuit ==
In April 2011, Ross learned of a Happy Days-themed casino machine that used her image. In response, she, Erin Moran, Don Most, Anson Williams, and the estate of Tom Bosley filed a $10 million lawsuit against Paramount, claiming they had not been paid for merchandising revenue. In July 2012, the lawsuit was settled, with each actor receiving a payment of $65,000 and CBS promising to honor the terms of their contracts.

== Personal life ==
Ross lived with Paul Michael at Happy Days Farm in Los Angeles, and Cardiff-by-the-Sea, Encinitas, California.

== Filmography ==
=== Film ===
Year	Title	Role	Notes
1953	Forever Female	Patty	
1954	The Glenn Miller Story	Polly Haynes	Uncredited
1954	Secret of the Incas	Miss Morris	Uncredited
1954	Pushover	Mrs. Crockett	Uncredited
1954	Sabrina	Spiller's Girlfriend	Uncredited
1956	The Proud and Profane	Joan	
1956	Lust for Life	Sister Clothilde	Uncredited
1956	The Best Things in Life Are Free	Nita Naldi-type	Uncredited
1956	Around the World in 80 Days	Unknown	Uncredited
1957	Lizzie	Ruth Seaton	
1957	God Is My Partner	Frances Denning	
1958	Teacher's Pet	Katy Fuller	
1958	Some Came Running	Sister Mary Joseph	
1959	The Big Circus	Unknown	
1959	It Started with a Kiss	Diane	
1959	Operation Petticoat	Lt. Colfax RN	
1961	Blueprint for Robbery	Young Woman	
1970	Airport	Joan Myers - Passenger	Uncredited
1970	Colossus: The Forbin Project	Angela Fields	
1971	Honky	Mrs. Divine	
1977	Grand Theft Auto	Vivian Hedgeworth	
1981	Midnight Offerings	Emily Moore	Television film
1996	The Evening Star	Rosie Dunlop	
1998	The Lake	Maggie	
1999	The Last Best Sunday	Mrs. Larksmont	
2003	Dickie Roberts: Former Child Star	Marion Ross	
2006	Where There's a Will	Leslie Clyde Onstott	
2007	Music Within	Grandma	
2007	Smiley Face	Shirley	
2008	Superhero Movie	Aunt Lucille	
2010	Scooby-Doo! Curse of the Lake Monster	Hilda Trowburg	
2012	Dear Dracula	Grandma	Voice
2014	A Reason	Aunt Irene Hilgrim	
2014	A Perfect Christmas List	Evie	
2018	Angels on Tap	Waitress	
2021	Senior Entourage	Marion	Final film role before retirement

=== Television ===
Year	Title	Role	Notes
1954	The Lone Ranger	Virginia Thorpe	Episode: "Texas Draw"
1958	Perry Mason	Helen Harvey	Episode: "The Case of the Romantic Rogue"
1958	Steve Canyon	Rita Bradshaw	Episode: "Zero Elevation Launch"
1959	The Untouchables	Vera Schultz	Episode: "The Dutch Schultz Story"
1959	The Donna Reed Show	Miss McGinnis	Episode: "Flowers For the Teacher"
1960	Father Knows Best	Miss Abrams	Episode: “Jim's Big Surprise”
1962	Rawhide	Priscilla Brewer	
1963	Route 66	Nora Belden	Episode: "The Stone Guest"
1964	The Outer Limits	Agnes Benjamin	Episode: "The Special One"
1965	The Fugitive	Marion Eckhardt	Episode: "Trial by Fire"
1968	Ironside	Shirley Petrizzi	Episode: "Barbara Who"
1969	Hawaii 5-O	Speciality Nurse Lavallo	Episode: "Blind Tiger"
1969	The Brady Bunch	Dr. Porter	Episode: "Is There a Doctor in the House"
1971	Mission: Impossible	Mrs. Foster	Episode: "A Ghost Story"
1973	Emergency!	Margaret	Episode: "Inheritance Tax"
1974–1984	Happy Days	Marion Cunningham ("Mrs. C")	Main role; 252 episodes
1986	The Love Boat	Emily Heywood ("Mrs. Stubing")	Guest role; 4 episodes
1989	Night Court	Mrs. Daley	Episode: "The Trouble Is Not in Your Set"
1989	Living Dolls	Marion Carlin	Episode: "Beauty and the Beat"
1990	MacGyver	Sister Robin	Episode: "Harry's Will"
1991–1993	Brooklyn Bridge	Sophie Berger	35 episodes
1997–2004	The Drew Carey Show	Beulah Carey	16 episodes
1997	The Sylvester & Tweety Mysteries	Flavia	Voice, episode: "Yelp"
1997	Superman: The Animated Series	General Richter	Voice, episode: "Speed Demons"
1998–1999	That '70s Show	Bernice Forman	4 episodes
2000	The Wild Thornberrys	Rebecca	Voice, episode: "Forget Me Not"
2001–2005	Gilmore Girls	Lorelai "Trix" Gilmore, Marilyn Gilmore	6 episodes
2001–2024	SpongeBob SquarePants	Grandma SquarePants	Voice, 5 episodes
2004	King of the Hill	Ms. Wakefield	Voice, episode: "Ms. Wakefield"
2005	Family Guy	Marion Cunningham	Voice, episode: "The Father, the Son, and the Holy Fonz"
2006–2011	Handy Manny	Mrs. Lopart	Voice, 10 episodes
2007	The Boondocks	Betty von Heuten	Voice, episode: "Thank You for Not Snitching"
2010	Scooby-Doo! Mystery Incorporated	Grandma Moonbeam	Voice, episode: "When the Cicada Calls"
2010	Grey's Anatomy	Betty Donahue (née Flynn)	Episode: "Shiny Happy People"
2011	Generator Rex	Determined Grandmother, Carmen, Grandma	Voice, 2 episodes
2016	The Odd Couple	Edna	Episode: "Taffy Days"
2017–2020	Please Tell Me I'm Adopted	Mrs. Grant	3 episodes
2018	Guardians of the Galaxy	Doctor Minerva	Voice, episode: "Gotta Get Outta This Place"

=== Stage ===
Year	Title	Role	Notes
1949	Twelfth Night	Olivia	Old Globe Theatre
1958	Edwin Booth	Asia Booth	46th Street Theatre, Broadway
1984	Catsplay	Paula	Old Globe Theatre
1986	Arsenic and Old Lace	Martha Brewster (Replacement)	46th Street Theatre, Broadway
1990	Independence	Kess Briggs	Burbank Little Theatre
1992	The Glass Menagerie	Amanda Wingfield	La Jolla Playhouse
1994	Pippin	Berthe	Cherry County Playhouse
1998	Love Letters	Melissa Gardener	Palos Verdes Players
2009	The Last Romance	Carol	New Theatre
2010	The Last Romance	Carol	Old Globe Theatre
2012	The Game's Afoot (or Holmes for the Holidays)	Martha Gillette	New Theatre Restaurant

=== Video games ===
Year	Title	Voice	Notes
2002	SpongeBob SquarePants: Employee of the Month	Grandma SquarePants	
2008	Madagascar: Escape 2 Africa	Nana	

== Book ==
- Ross, Marion (with David Laurell) (March 27, 2018). My Days: Happy and Otherwise. Kensington Books. ISBN 978-1-496-71515-9.
