= Lance Kerwin =

American actor (1960–2023)

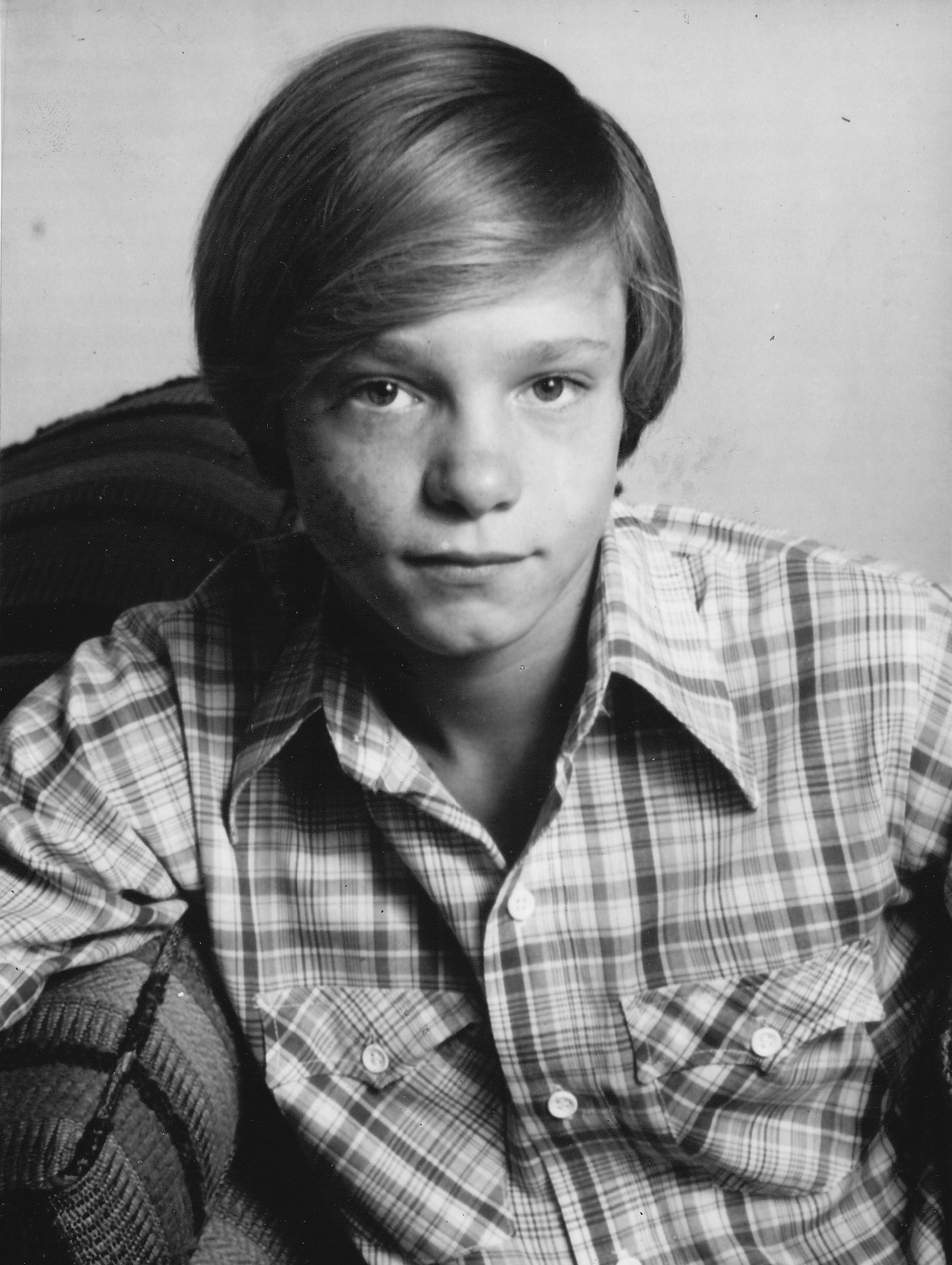
- Kerwin in 1977 in James at 15
- Born: Lance Michael Kerwin; November 6, 1960; Newport Beach, California, U.S.
- Died: January 24, 2023 (aged 62); San Clemente, California, U.S.
- Years active: 1974–1995; 2022
- Spouse(s): Kristen Lansdale (divorced) Yvonne Kerwin (m. 1998)
- Children: 5

Lance Michael Kerwin (November 6, 1960 – January 24, 2023) was an American actor, known primarily for roles in television and film during his childhood and teen years in the 1970s. He played lead roles in the TV series James at 15 as well as the TV films The Loneliest Runner and Salem's Lot.

== Early life and career ==
Kerwin was raised in Lake Elsinore, California. His father, Don Kerwin, was an acting coach, who brought home scripts for his son to read. His mother, Lois, was also a performer and later, a talent agent. He was the youngest of five brothers. His brother Shane was his stand-in.

In the 1970s, Kerwin appeared in a number of TV movies and series. He was, said former theater critic and British Film Institute governor John Holmstrom, "probably America's leading boy actor of the late Seventies ... a handsome lad ... [with] considerable sensitivity as an actor". His serious acting roles often portrayed anguished characters facing difficult challenges, such as in The Loneliest Runner, The Boy Who Drank Too Much, and Children of Divorce.

In 1985, he co-starred in "The Snow Queen", a retelling of Hans Christian Andersen's classic tale in an episode of Shelley Duvall's children's television series Faerie Tale Theatre.

== Personal life and death ==
Kerwin had a daughter, Savanah Paige, with Kristen Lansdale, and four children with his wife Yvonne Kerwin. He gave up acting in the mid-1990s, but returned to the screen in 2022 for The Wind & the Reckoning, filmed in Hawaii.

In July 2010, it was reported that Kerwin was working as a pastor at Calvary Chapel in Kapaʻa, Hawaii, and a program leader at U-Turn for Christ, a drug and alcohol rehabilitation organization. The report also stated that Kerwin and his wife Yvonne pled guilty to falsifying documents to obtain state medical assistance in Hawaii after neglecting to report his ownership of three properties on the mainland. Kerwin was sentenced to five years' probation and 300 hours of community service. He also continued to work in theater while on the island of Kauaʻi.

Kerwin died in San Clemente, California, on January 24, 2023. An immediate cause was not listed, but later reported it was due to ischemic heart disease and atherosclerotic coronary artery disease.

== Filmography ==
- Emergency! (1973, TV series) – Wheeler Boy
- The Healers (1974, TV movie) – Kennedy Brown
- Little House on the Prairie (1974, TV series) – Danny Peters
- Shazam! (1974 TV series) – Season 1 Episode 2 – Chad Martin
- Cannon (1974 TV series) – Season 4 Episode 6 – Unnamed Delivery Boy
- The Greatest Gift (1974, TV movie) – Ramey Holvak
- Reflections of Murder (1974, TV movie) – Chip
- The Meanest Men in the West aka Bad Men of the West (1974, TV series)
- ABC Afterschool Special (1974–1976, TV series) – P.J. / The President's Son / Buzz / Peter Finley / Adam Rush / Ezzie
- Gunsmoke (1975, TV series) – Tommy Harker
- Escape to Witch Mountain (1975) – Boy in Blue-Striped Shirt (uncredited)
- The Family Holvak (1975, TV series) – Ramey Holvak
- Sara (1976, TV series) – Derek
- Amelia Earhart (1976, TV movie) – David Putnam
- The Loneliest Runner (1976, TV movie) – John Curtis as a Youth
- The Death of Richie (1977, TV movie) – Russell Werner
- Wonder Woman (1977, TV series) – Jeff Hadley
- The Bionic Woman (1977, TV series) – Prince Ishmail
- Cheering Section (1977) – Bob
- Young Joe, the Forgotten Kennedy (1977, TV movie) – Joe, Jr. (age 14)
- James at 15 (1977–1978, TV series) – James Hunter
- The Busters (1978, TV movie)
- Family (1978, TV series) - Dexter Bates
- Salem's Lot (1979, TV movie) – Mark Petrie
- Once Upon a Midnight Scary (1979, TV series)
- The Boy Who Drank Too Much (1980, TV movie) – Billy Carpenter
- Children of Divorce (1980, TV movie) – Tony Malik
- Side Show (1981, TV movie) – Nick Pallas
- Advice to the Lovelorn (1981, TV movie) – Larry Ames
- CBS Schoolbreak Special (1982, TV series) – Billy Lee Daniels
- The Mysterious Stranger (1982, TV movie) – #44
- Trapper John, M.D. (1982–1985, TV series) – Gary Gordon/42
- A Killer in the Family (1983, TV movie) – Ray Tison
- Faerie Tale Theatre: The Snow Queen (1985, TV series) – Kay
- The Fourth Wise Man (1985, TV movie) – Passhur
- Enemy Mine (1986) – Wooster
- Murder, She Wrote (1989, TV series) – Eddie Frayne
- Final Verdict (1991, TV movie) – Harry Johnson
- Outbreak (1995) – American Mercenary
- The Wind & the Reckoning (2022) – Anderson
