= Bibliography of works on Davy Crockett =

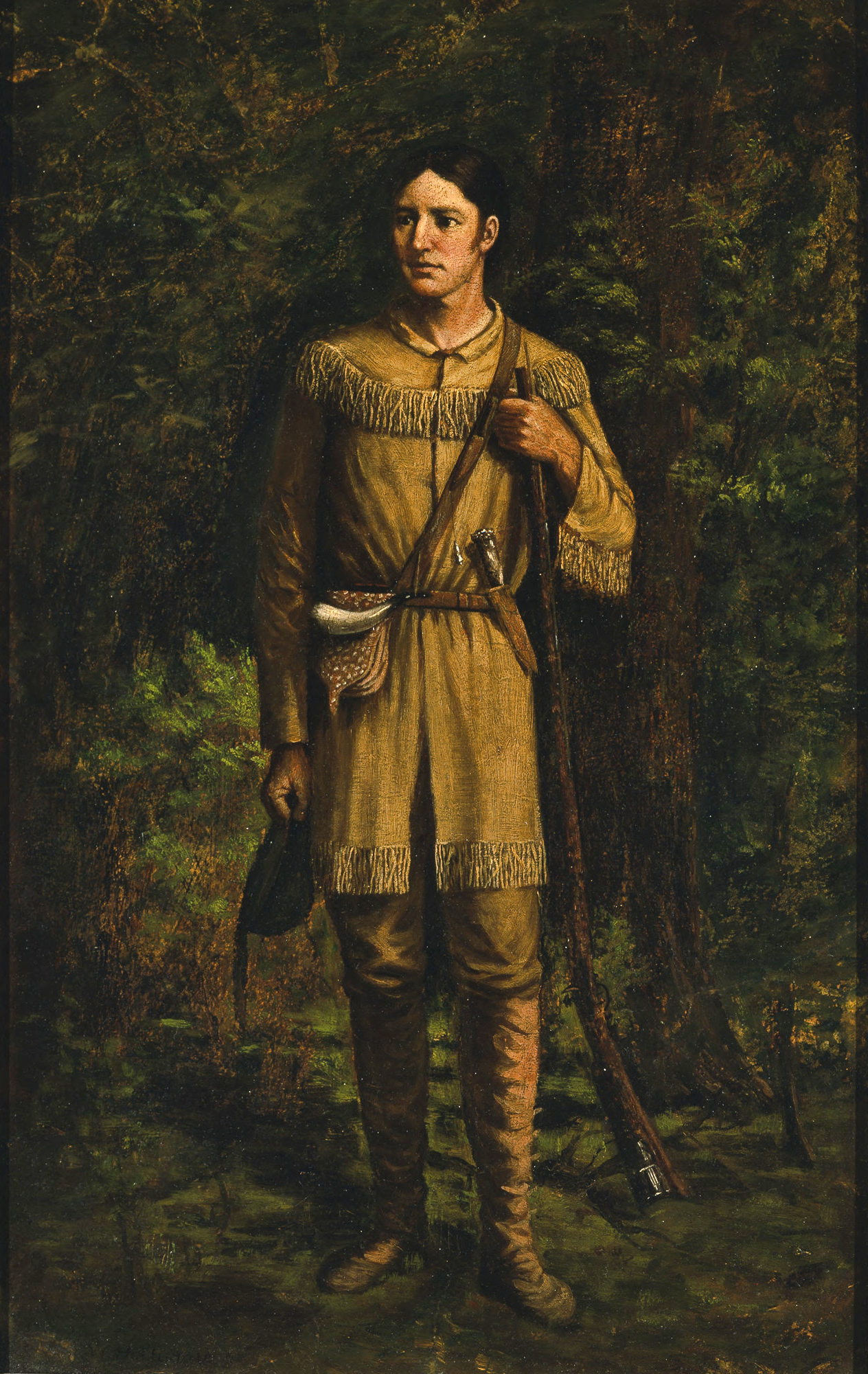
Davy Crockett by William Henry Huddle, 1889

David "Davy" Crockett (August 17, 1786 – March 6, 1836) was a 19th-century American folk hero, frontiersman, soldier and politician, who died at the Battle of the Alamo.

Crockett was born in Limestone, Greene County, Tennessee, (at that time, part of North Carolina). He served in the militia of Lawrence County, Tennessee and was elected to the Tennessee state legislature in 1821. In 1827, he was elected to the U.S. Congress. Due to his opposition to the Indian Removal Act during the administration of President Andrew Jackson, he was defeated in the next election, but made a political comeback in 1833. He subsequently lost his 1835 re-election bid and angrily left Tennessee for Texas (then the Mexican state of Tejas). His wife and children remained behind in Tennessee.

All that is certain about Crockett's death, is that he died at the Battle of the Alamo. A former American slave named Ben, who was a cook for one of Santa Anna's officers, maintained that Crockett's body was found in the barracks surrounded by "no less than sixteen Mexican corpses", with Crockett's knife buried in one of them. Stories that Crockett was among a group who surrendered, and were subsequently executed, began circulating immediately after the tragedy. His life and legacy has been written about extensively, beginning in 1834 with a biography reputed to have been written by Crockett himself, but in reality was at least partly ghost written by Thomas Chilton.

== Bibliography ==
Davy Crockett bibliography
Author	Title	Publisher	Pub Date	Notes	Refs
John Stevens Cabot Abbott	David Crockett: his life and adventures	Dodd, Mead and Company	1874	OCLC 646860448: David Crockett: his life and adventures at Project Gutenberg	
John Stevens Cabot Abbott	The Terror of the Indians; or, the Adventures of D. Crockett with Illustrations	Ward Lock & Co	1879	OCLC 792749679	
John Stevens Cabot Abbott	David Crockett	Dodd, Mead and Co	1898	OCLC 2991094	
Charles Fletcher Allen	David Crockett, Scout: Small Boy, Pilgrim, Mountaineer, Soldier, Bear-Hunter and Congressman, Defender of the Alamo	J. B. Lippincott & Co.	1911		
Elaine M. Alphin	Davy Crockett	Lerner Publishing Group	2003	Illustrated by Tim Parlin; OCLC 48871534; ISBN 978-0-8225-1564-7	
John Joseph Arpad	David Crockett, An Original Eccentricity and Early American Character	Duke University	1969	Ph.D. dissertation OCLC 21010592	
Frank Lee Beals	Davy Crockett	Chicago Wheeler	1960		
Frank Lee Beals	Real Adventure with American Pathfinders : Daniel Boone, Lewis and Clark, Zebulon Pike, Davy Crockett	H. Wagner Publishing	1954	Edited by Lowell C Ballard; OCLC 9046227	
Walter Blair	Davy Crockett, Legendary Frontier Hero: His True Life Story and the Fabulous Tall Tales Told About Him	Lincoln-Herndon Press	1986		
James R. BoylstonAllen J. Wiener	David Crockett in Congress: The Rise and Fall of the Poor Man's Friend	Bright Sky Press	2009		
James Wakefield Burke	David Crockett, The Man Behind the Myth	Eakins Press	1984	OCLC 10208220; ISBN 978-0-89015-437-3	
Anna Grace Catron	The Public Career of David Crockett	University of Tennessee	1955	OCLC 9526282; Master's thesis	
Elizabeth Coatsworth	Old Whirlwind; a Story of Davy Crockett	Macmillan	1953	Pictures by Manning de V. Lee also published in Swedish	
Manley F. Cobia	Journey Into the Land of Trials : The Story of Davy Crockett's Expedition to the Alamo	Hillsboro Press	2003	OCLC 52223857; ISBN 978-1-57736-268-5	
Jane Corby	The Story of David Crockett	Barse & Hopkins	1922	OCLC 3131543	
James E. Crisp	Sleuthing the Alamo: Davy Crockett's Last Stand and Other Mysteries of the Texas Revolution	Oxford University Press	2005	OCLC 54960634; ISBN 978-0-19-516350-6	
Davy Crockett	A Narrative of the Life of David Crockett of the State of Tennessee	E.L. Carey and A. Hart	1834	OCLC 1698539; Co-authored (or ghost written) by Thomas Chilton	
Davy Crockett	Sketches and eccentricities of Col. David Crockett of West Tennessee	J & J Harper/O. Rich	1833	OCLC 16823280; Credited to Crockett, but actually written by Mathew St. Clair Clarke	
Davy Crockett	"Go ahead!" : Davy Crockett's Almanack of Wild Sports of the West and Life in the Backwoods : Calculated for All the States in the Union : 1835	Snag & Sawyer	1834	Crockett's almanac has been published multiple times under varied titles	
Davy Crockett	Davy Crockett and His Adventures in Texas Told Mostly by Himself	Charles Scribner's Sons	1934	OCLC 98903811	
Davy Crockett	An Autobiography of Davy Crockett	Skyhorse Publishing	2011	OCLC 1051846; ISBN 978-1-61608-400-4 edited by Steve Brennan	
William C. Davis	Three Roads to the Alamo : The Lives and Fortunes of Davy Crockett, James Bowie, and William Barret Travis	HarperCollins	2009	OCLC 809723407; ISBN 978-0-06-017334-0	
William C. Davis	Lone Star Rising-The Revolutionary Birth of the Texas Republic	Free Press	2004	OCLC 53091400; ISBN 0-684-86510-6	
Hazel H. Davis	Davy Crockett	Random House	1955		
Mark Derr	The Frontiersman : The Real Life and the Many Legends of Davy Crockett	William Morrow and Company	1993	OCLC 27034755; ISBN 978-0-688-13798-4	
Edward S. Ellis	The Texan Trailer, or, Davy Crockett's Last bear Hunt	Beadle and Co	1871	OCLC 23100866	
Edward S. Ellis	The Life of Davy Crockett	Mantle Ministries	2000	OCLC 48369449	
Stanley J. Folmsbee	The Early Career of David Crockett	East Tennessee Historical Society Publications	1956	Anna Grace Catron co-writer OCLC 310377152	
Stanley J. Folmsbee	David Crockett: Congressman	East Tennessee Historical Society Publications	1957	Anna Grace Catron co-writer	
Stanley J. Folmsbee	David Crockett in Texas	East Tennessee Historical Society Publications	1958		
Stanley J. Folmsbee	David Crocket and His Autobiography	East Tennessee Historical Society Publications	1971		
Stanley J. Folmsbee	David Crockett and West Tennessee	East Tennessee Historical Society Publications	1974		
Janie Preston Collup French	Davy Crockett and the Crockett Family	Chattanooga: Lookout Pub. Co	1951	Zella Armstrong co-writer OCLC 2721129	
Bill Groneman	Death of a Legend: The Myth and Mystery Surrounding the Death of Davy Crockett	Republic of Texas Press	1999	OCLC 45733790; ISBN 978-1-55622-688-5	
Bill Groneman	David Crockett: Hero of the Common Man	Forge Books	2007	OCLC 58919622; ISBN 978-0-7653-1067-5	
Herbert L. Harper	Houston and Crockett: Heroes of Tennessee and Texas: An Anthology.	Nashville: Tennessee Historical Commission	1986		
M. J. Heale	The Role of the Frontier in Jacksonian Politics: David Crockett and the Myth of the Self-Made Man	Western Historical Quarterly	1973		
Daniel G. Hoffman	Deaths and Three Resurrections of Davy Crockett	Antioch Review	1951		
Albert Ross Hogue	Davy Crockett and Others in Fentress County Who Have Given the County a Prominent Place in History		1955	OCLC 6657672	
Marianne Johnston	Davy Crockett	PowerKids Press	2001	OCLC 45163793OCLC 53091400; ISBN 0-684-86510-6ISBN 978-0-8239-5581-7	
Randell Jones	In the Footsteps of Davy Crockett	John F. Blair	2006	OCLC 63122721OCLC 53091400; ISBN 0-684-86510-6ISBN 978-0-89587-324-8	
Dan Kilgore	How Did Davy Die? And Why Do We Care So Much?	Texas A&M University Press	2010	OCLC 0622482OCLC 53091400; ISBN 0-684-86510-6ISBN 978-1-60344-194-0	
Buddy Levy	The Real Life Adventures of David Crockett	Putnam Press	2005	OCLC 61254063OCLC 53091400; ISBN 0-684-86510-6ISBN 0-399-15278-4	
Michael Lofaro	Davy Crockett: The Man, the Legend, the Legacy, 1786–1986	University of Tennessee Press	1985	OCLC 11442284OCLC 53091400; ISBN 0-684-86510-6ISBN 978-0-87049-459-8	
Michael Lofaro	Crockett at Two Hundred: New Perspectives on the Man and the Myth.	University of Tennessee Press	1989	OCLC 18560446OCLC 53091400; ISBN 0-684-86510-6ISBN 978-0-87049-592-2	
C. Grant Loomis	Davy Crockett Visits Boston	New England Quarterly	1947		
Michael J. Mendenhall	Davy Crockett and the Unconstitutional Welfare State	The Institute for Constitutional Research	1990	OCLC 26022972OCLC 53091400; ISBN 0-684-86510-6ISBN 978-0-9625954-1-7	
Guy S. Miles	David Crockett Evolves, 1821–1824	American Quarterly	1956		
Marion Michael Null	The Forgotten Pioneer: The Life of Davy Crockett	Vantage Press	1954	OCLC 2086951	
Constance Rourke	Davy Crockett	University of Nebraska Press	1998	OCLC 247667981OCLC 53091400; ISBN 0-684-86510-6ISBN 978-0-8032-8967-3	
C. Richard Schaare,	The Life of Davy Crockett in Picture and Story	Cupples & Leon Company	1935	OCLC 7126595	
James Atkins Shackford	The Autobiography of David Crockett : An Annotated Edition with Portraits, Maps, and Appendices	Vanderbilt University	1948	OCLC 10614555	
James Atkins Shackford	David Crockett: The Man and the Legend	University of North Carolina Press	1994	OCLC 1669759	
James Atkins Shackford	David Crockett and North Carolina	North Carolina Historical Review	1951		
Jonathan Kennon Smith	The Land Holdings of Colonel David Crockett in West Tennessee	J.K.T. Smith	2003	OCLC 54022513	
Richard Penn Smith	On to the Alamo: Col. Crockett's Exploits and Adventures in Texas	U.P. Kaes	1839	Reprinted in 2003 Penguin Books	
John W. Thomason	Davy Crockett and His Adventures in Texas	Scribner	1934	OCLC 6106910	
William C. Sprague	Davy Crockett	Macmillan	1915	OCLC 5208618	
Stuart A. Stiffler	Davy Crockett: The Genesis of Heroic Myth	Tennessee Historical Quarterly	1954	OCLC 730049269	
Vincent F. Taylor	David Crockett, the Bravest of Them All, Who Died in the Alamo	Naylor Co	1955	OCLC 3424902	
Robert M. Torrence; Robert L. Whittenburg	Colonel Davy Crockett	H. Fagan	1956	OCLC 13679847	
Sanford Tousey	Davy Crockett, Hero of the Alamo	A. Whitman	1898	OCLC 1888480	
Michael Wallis	David Crockett: the Lion of the West	W. W. Norton & Company	2011	OCLC 601108943; ISBN 978-0-393-06758-3	
