= Anti-American sentiment in Germany =

Dislike of the American government or people in Germany

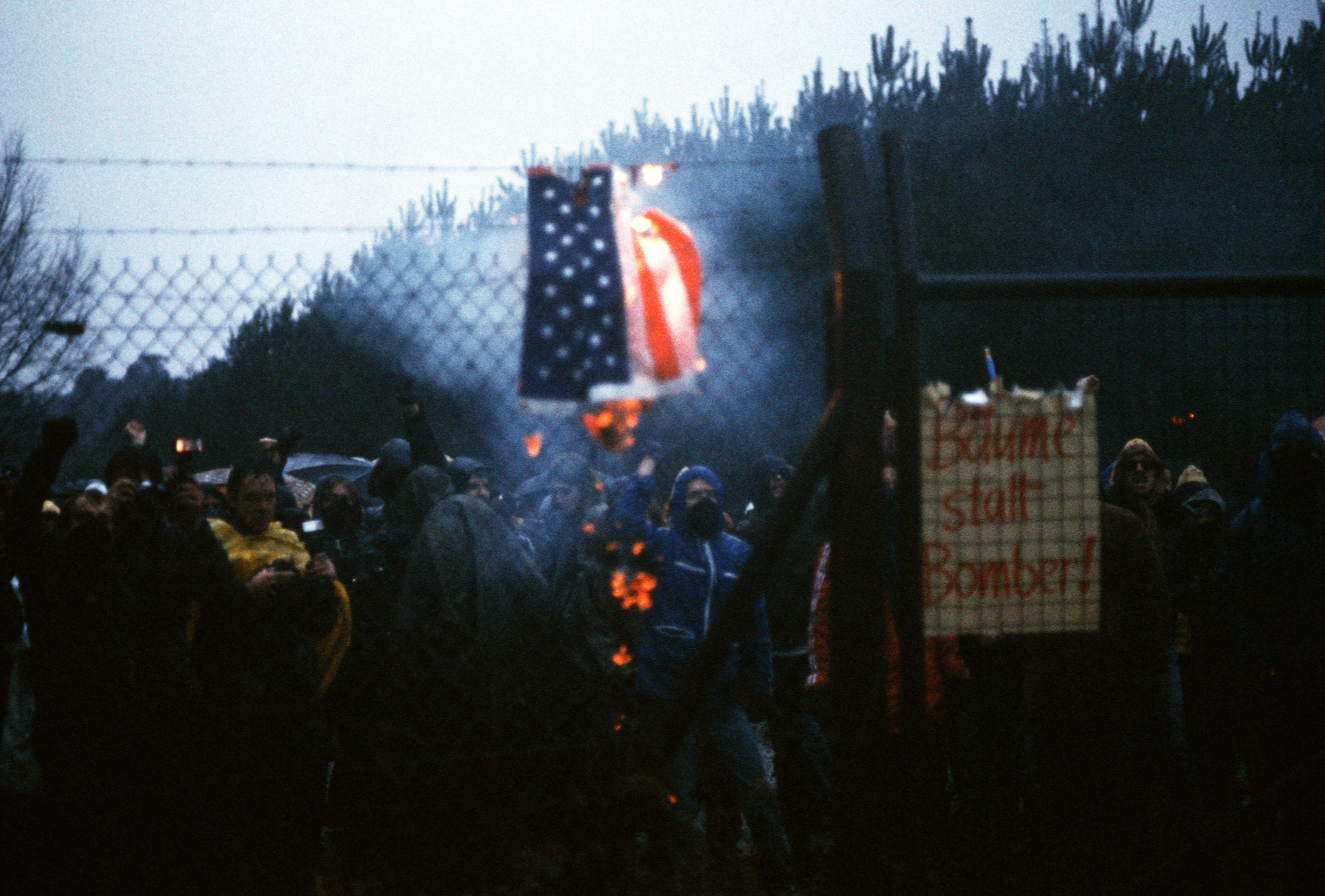
Demonstrators set an American flag in flames during a protest against the Pershing II deployment in Germany, 1982.

Anti-American sentiment in Germany is the dislike of the American government or people present in Germany. Anti-Americanism has been present in Germany throughout history with several notable incidents. Anti-Americanism was advanced by local leaders under the influence of the former Soviet Union, during the Cold War in East Germany, with dissenters being punished. In West Germany, this sentiment was generally limited to left wing politicians.

Scholars such as Noam Chomsky and Nancy Snow have argued that the application of the term "anti-American" to the population of other countries does not make any sense, as it implies that not liking the American government or its policies is socially undesirable or even comparable to a crime. In this regard, Chomsky likened the term to the propagandistic usage of the term "anti-Sovietism" in the USSR.

== History ==
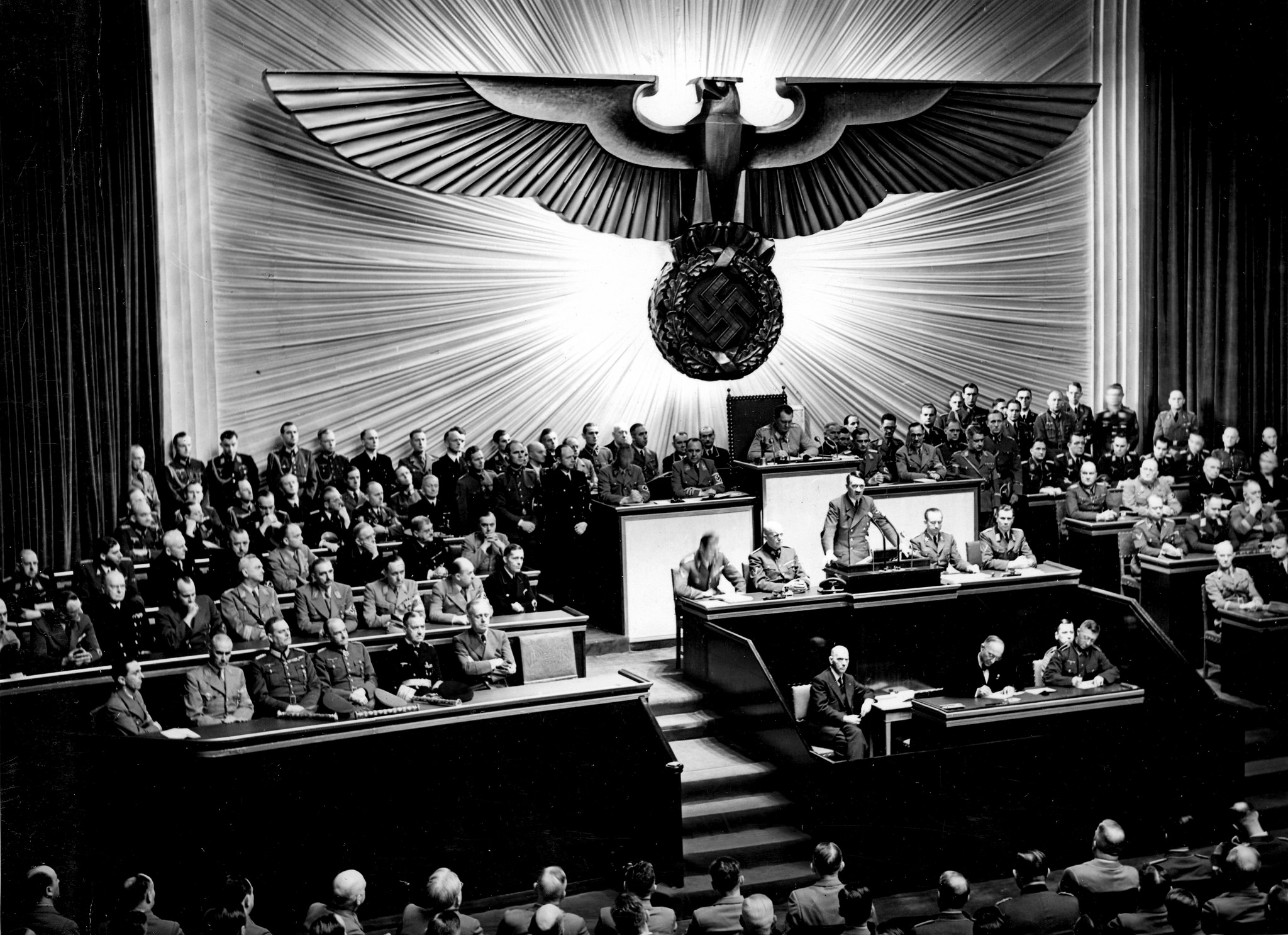
Adolf Hitler announces the declaration of war against the United States to the Reichstag on 11 December 1941.

During 1820-40 era, hostility toward America stemmed from its perceived cultural inferiority. Between 1820 and 1870, more than seven and a half million German immigrants came to the United States, buying farms or taking industrial jobs. Few returned to their homeland.

=== World Wars ===
Germany and the United States were at war with each other from 1917 till 1918 and from 1941 till 1945.

=== Divided Germany ===
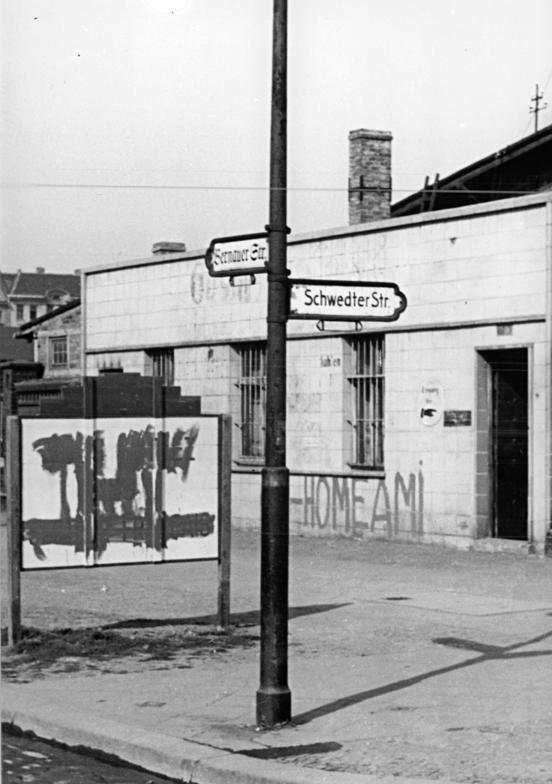
The anti-American slogan "Go home, Ami" in West Berlin on the former sector border

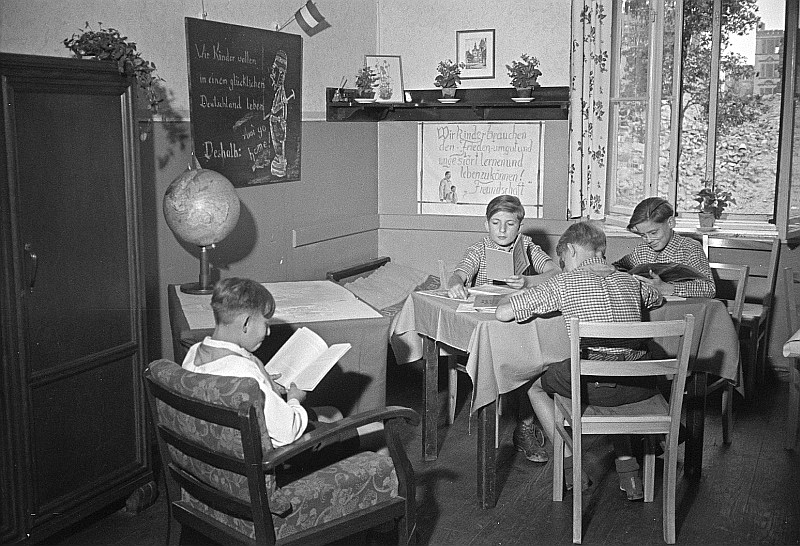
Children’s home in the GDR (East Germany) 1951. The slogan can be seen on the blackboard.

Anti-Americanism was common while Germany was divided after the Second World War. This anti-American sentiment was present in both West and East Germany. However, it was mostly present in East Germany due to Soviet and East German propaganda.

Some right wingers saw the United States as a protector against communism, while others saw the American way of life as uncultured.

Since 1950, many European communist parties and their supporters used the slogan against the presence of US soldiers: In 1951, "disruptive troops of the Socialist Unity Party of Germany and Free German Youth" on West Berlin train stations had adhesive strips with the slogan "Ami go home!" written on those strips. However, these protests were declared "unlawful" by the West Berlin Police Chief. In addition, the slogan “Yankee go home” was used mainly in countries where a strong Political Left turned against the US military presence within the framework of NATO, as in France (until 1966) or Italy.

In the 1960s, the slogan was used in response to the Vietnam War by the extra-parliamentary opposition and remained current during the time of the peace movement in the 1970s. After that, it increasingly disappeared from public perception, but rather passed into general language with an ironic undertone.

=== 21st century ===
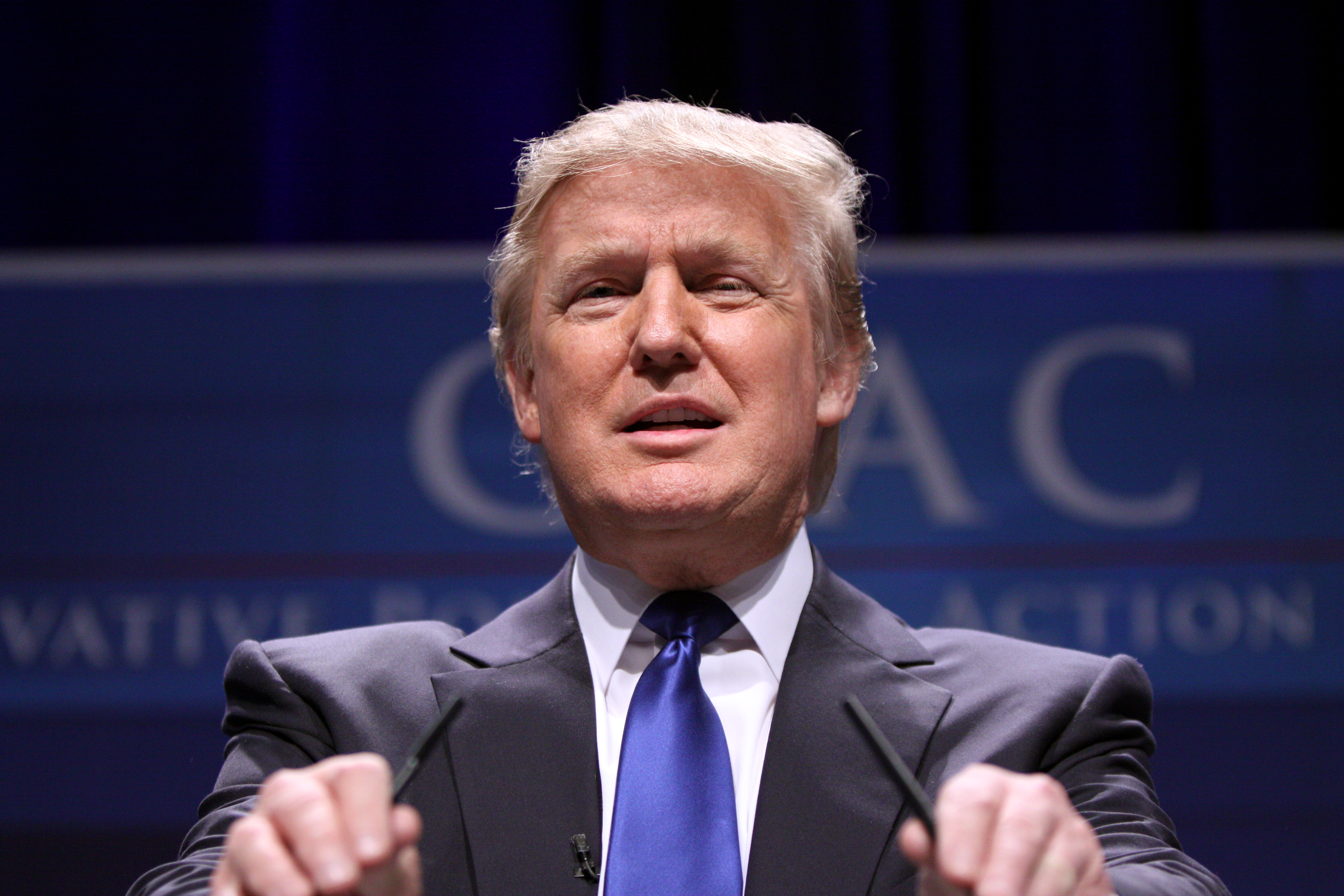
American think-tanks have raised concerns about the Presidency of Donald Trump fuelling anti-Americanism in Germany.

Anti-Americanism reappeared among some intellectuals after the September 11 attacks because of the perceived links between globalisation, Americanisation, and terrorism.

The Iraq War was highly unpopular at all levels of German society. Chancellor Gerhard Schröder stated that Germany would refuse to provide troops or money for the 2003 invasion of Iraq. With the 2016 election of Donald Trump, there have been renewed fears among American think-tanks about the rise of anti-American sentiment in Germany. Donald Trump, the grandson of a German immigrant, has been noted for his euroscepticism, while Germany is one of the most pro-EU countries in the world. In 2017, German magazine Stern published a cover depicting Donald Trump performing the Nazi salute, with the inscription Sein Kampf, in reference to Mein Kampf. In a 2015 survey, 50 percent of respondents in Germany reported having a favorable view of the United States, while 45 percent reported an unfavorable view.

== In films ==
In Billy Wilder's film One, Two, Three – which takes place in divided Berlin shortly before the construction of the Berlin Wall – the modified slogan "Yankee go home" is written on balloons. Justification of the writer, who comes from the American South in the film, where the term "Yankee" is used for Americans from northern states: "It doesn't say 'Ami go home', but 'Yankee go home', and nobody likes it!"

== In literature ==
A selection of literature in German contains the words "Ami go home" in the title. These include:

- Amt für Information der Regierung der DDR (Office for Information of the Government of the GDR), (ed.) Ami go home. Warum die Amis heimgehen sollen (Ami go home. Why the Americans Should Go home). Die Wahrheit dem Volke, Heft 7 (The Truth to the People, Issue 7), Deutscher Zentralverlag, Berlin, 1950 (German Central Publishing House, Berlin, 1950.)
- Ernst Busch, Hanns Eisler: Ami – go home! Ernst Busch (ed.): Friedenslieder. Heft 2 (Peace Songs, Volume 2), Verlag Lied der Zeit (Songs of the Time Publishing House), Berlin o.J. (1952)
- James Wakefield Burke: Ami go home. Ein Roman aus unseren Tagen (Ami go home. A Novel from our Days), Amsel, Berlin, 1954
- Reinhard Federmann [de]: Ami go home. Stück in 25 Szenen (Ami go home. Piece in 25 Scenes), Sessler, Pfarrkirchen, Munich o.J. [around 1983]
- Rolf Winter: Ami go home: Plädoyer für den Abschied von einem gewalttätigen Land (Ami go home: Plea for the Farewell to a Violent Country), Rasch and Röhring, Hamburg 1989, ISBN 3-89136-288-9
- Ingrid Bauer: Welcome, Ami go home. die amerikanische Besatzung in Salzburg 1945–1955; Erinnerungslandschaften aus einem Oral-history-Projekt (Welcome, Ami go home. The American Occupation in Salzburg 1945–1955; Memory Landscapes from an Oral History Project), Pustet, Salzburg 1998, ISBN 3-7025-0371-4
- Wilhelm Langthaler, Werner Pirker: Ami go home. Zwölf gute Gründe für einen Antiamerikanismus (Twelve Good Reasons for anti-Americanism), Promedia Vienna 2003 ISBN 978-3-85371-204-7

== See also ==
- Germany–United States relations
- Anti-American Sentiment
- Cold War
