= Audubon (book) =

1936 children's biography of James Audubon by Constance Rourke

- Title page for Audubon (1936)
- Author: Constance Rourke
- Illustrator: James MacDonald
- Language: English
- Genre: Children's literature / Biography
- Publisher: Harcourt
- Publication date: 1936
- Publication place: United States
- Pages: 342

Audubon is a 1936 children's biography of John James Audubon written by Constance Rourke and illustrated by James MacDonald.

== Reception ==
The book earned a Newbery Honor in 1937, Rourke's second after the also-biographical Davy Crockett in 1935. In their review, the New York Times said Rourke "succeeded somehow in looking at Audubon's life in somewhat the same way that Audubon looked at a bird". Kirkus Reviews commended Rourke for her research, which "unearthed new material, and put the breath of life into old". The Journal of Southern History was less flattering in their review, saying Rourke "contributed but little that is new to the knowledge of Audubon's life" and "softened or ignored his [Audubon] faults and failings."
