= Orville T. Waring House =

- U.S. National Register of Historic Places
- U.S. Historic district – Contributing property
- New Jersey Register of Historic Places
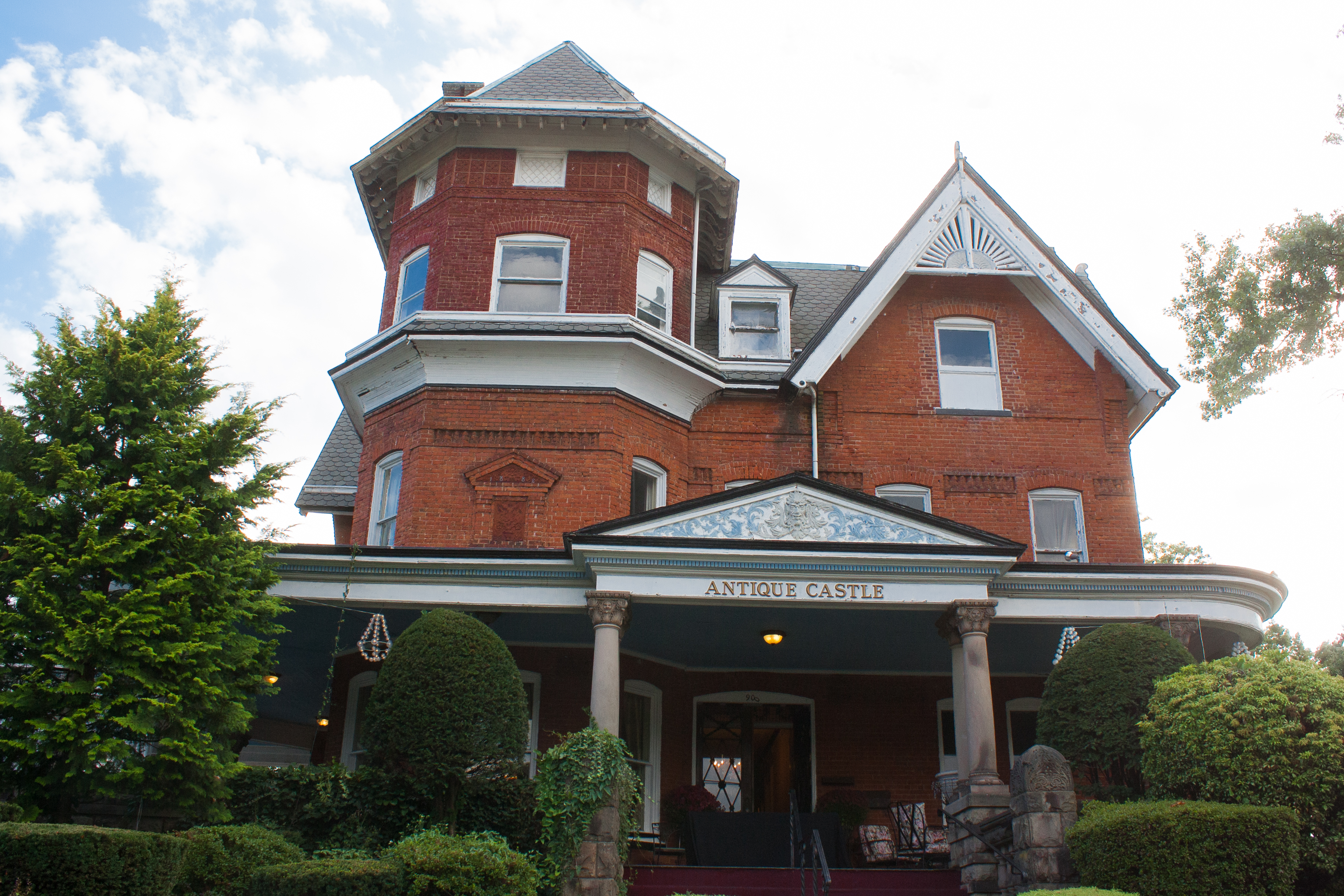

- Location within Union County, New Jersey Location within New Jersey Location within the United States
- Location: 900 Park Avenue; Plainfield, New Jersey
- Coordinates: 40°36′46″N 74°24′53″W
- Built: 1881
- Architect: Charles H. Smith
- Architectural style: Late Victorian
- Part of: Van Wyck Brooks Historic District (ID85003337)
- NRHP reference No.: 79003252
- NJRHP No.: 2709

Significant dates
- Added to NRHP: May 14, 1979
- Designated CP: December 10, 1985
- Designated NJRHP: February 16, 1979

The Orville T. Waring House is a historic building located at 900 Park Avenue in the city of Plainfield in Union County, New Jersey. Built in 1881, it was added to the National Register of Historic Places on May 14, 1979, for its significance in architecture, commerce, and industry. Orville Taylor Waring was an oil industry pioneer. The house was added as a contributing property to the Van Wyck Brooks Historic District on December 10, 1985.

== See also ==
- National Register of Historic Places listings in Union County, New Jersey
