= Van Wyck Brooks Historic District =

- U.S. National Register of Historic Places
- U.S. Historic district
- New Jersey Register of Historic Places
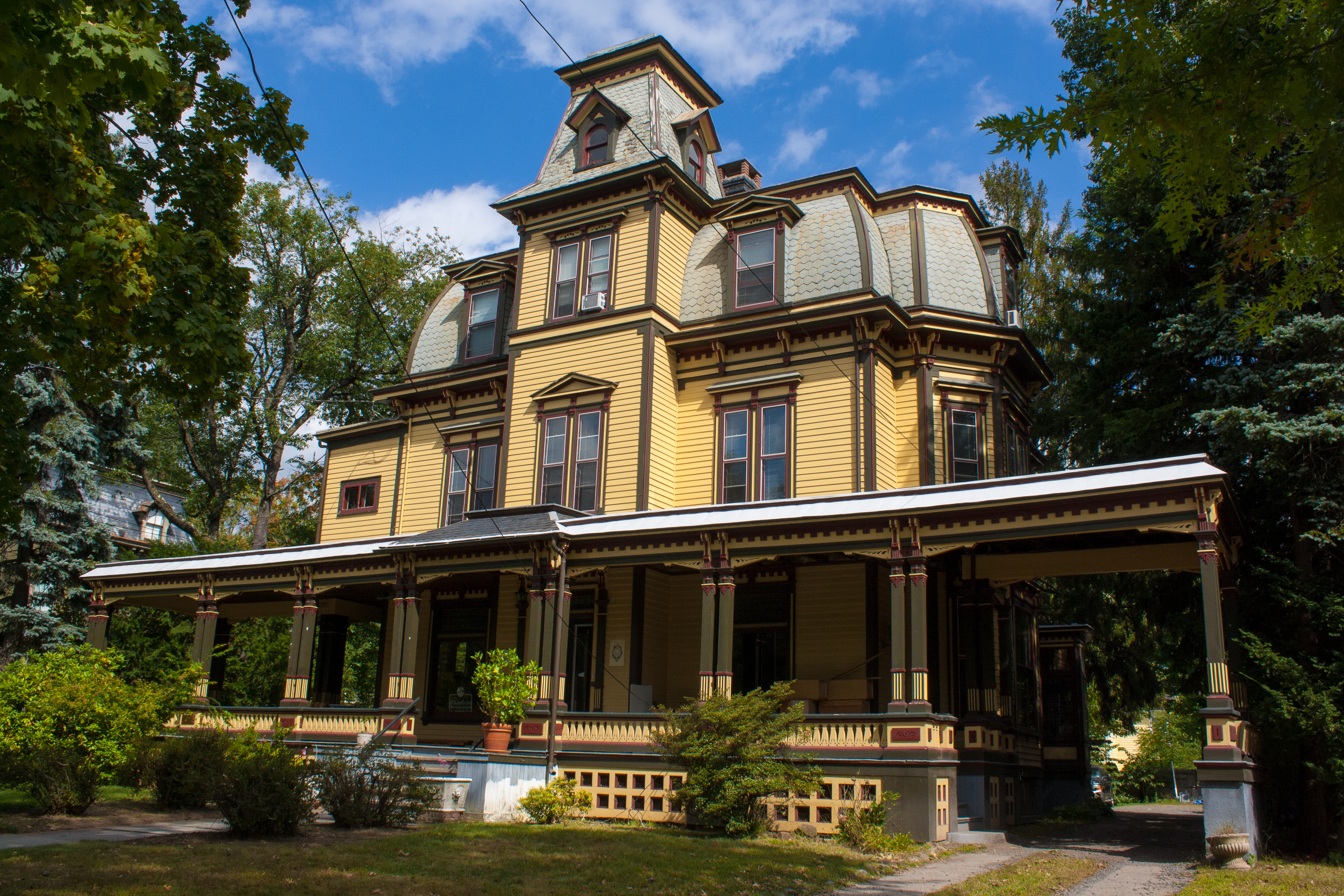
- Second Empire House at 935 Central Avenue

- Location within Union County, New Jersey Location within New Jersey Location within the United States
- Location: Roughly bounded by Plainfield Ave., W. Eighth St., Park Ave., W. Ninth St. and Madison Ave., and Randolph Rd. Plainfield, New Jersey
- Coordinates: 40°36′35″N 74°25′6″W
- Area: 99 acres (40 ha)
- Architectural style: Late 19th And 20th Century Revivals, Late Victorian, Second Empire, Tudor Revival
- NRHP reference No.: 85003337
- NJRHP No.: 2708

Significant dates
- Added to NRHP: December 10, 1985
- Designated NJRHP: October 7, 1985

The Van Wyck Brooks Historic District is a 99-acre (40 ha) historic district located in the city of Plainfield in Union County, New Jersey. Named after the author and literary critic Van Wyck Brooks, it was added to the National Register of Historic Places on December 10, 1985, for its significance in architecture. The district includes 109 contributing buildings. The Orville T. Waring House was added individually to the NRHP in 1979 and contributes to the district.

== History and description ==
The district is in a residential area of Plainfield. Most of the houses date from 1875 to 1925 and display various architectural styles. The house at 935 Central Avenue was built c. 1870 and features Second Empire architecture with a mansard roof. The house at 901 Madison Avenue was built c. 1875 with Victorian architecture. The Waring House, another Victorian, was built in 1881 for oil industry pioneer Orville Taylor Waring. The house at 305 Stelle Avenue was built in 1909 with Tudor Revival architecture and features a half-timbered look.

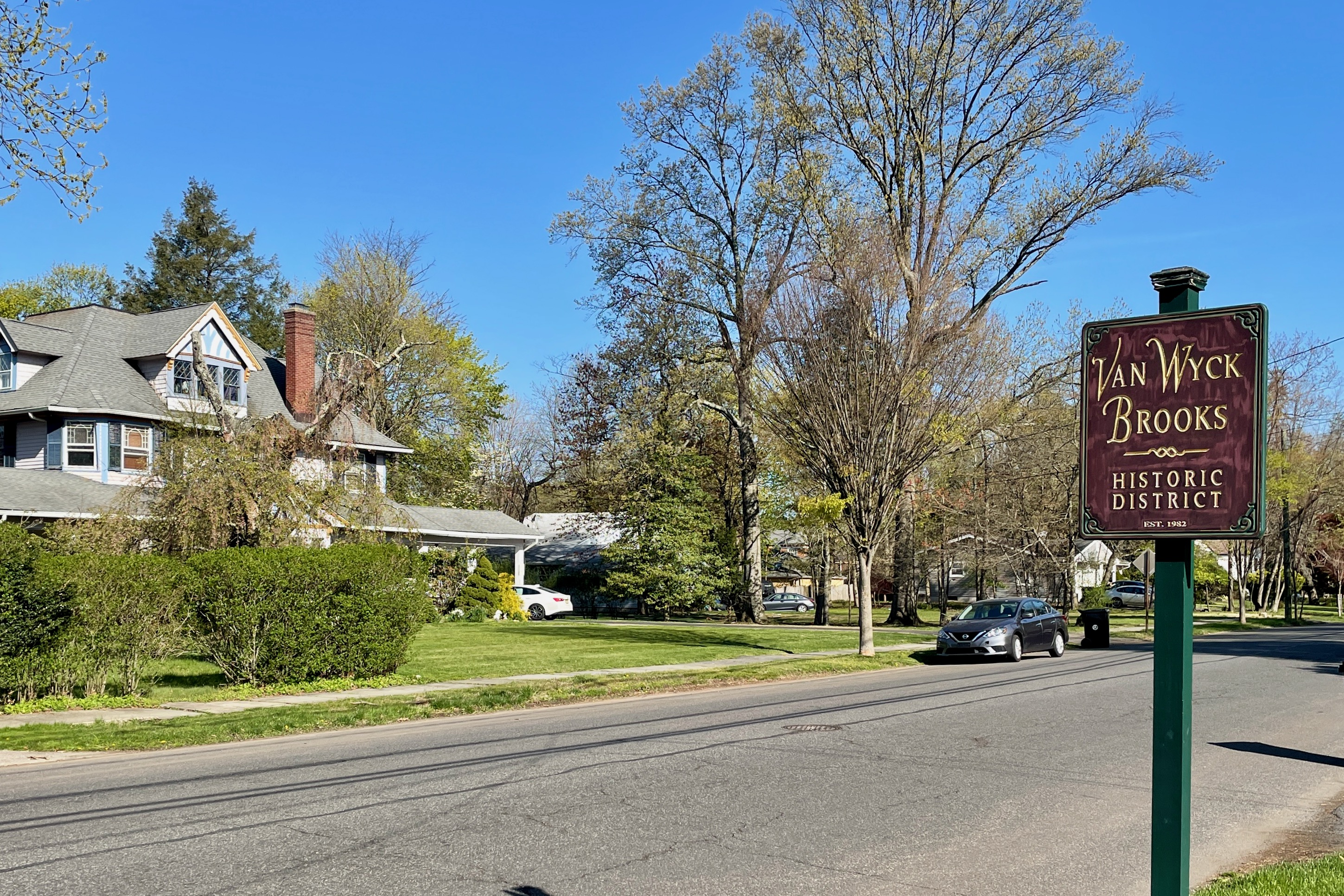
Historic district sign

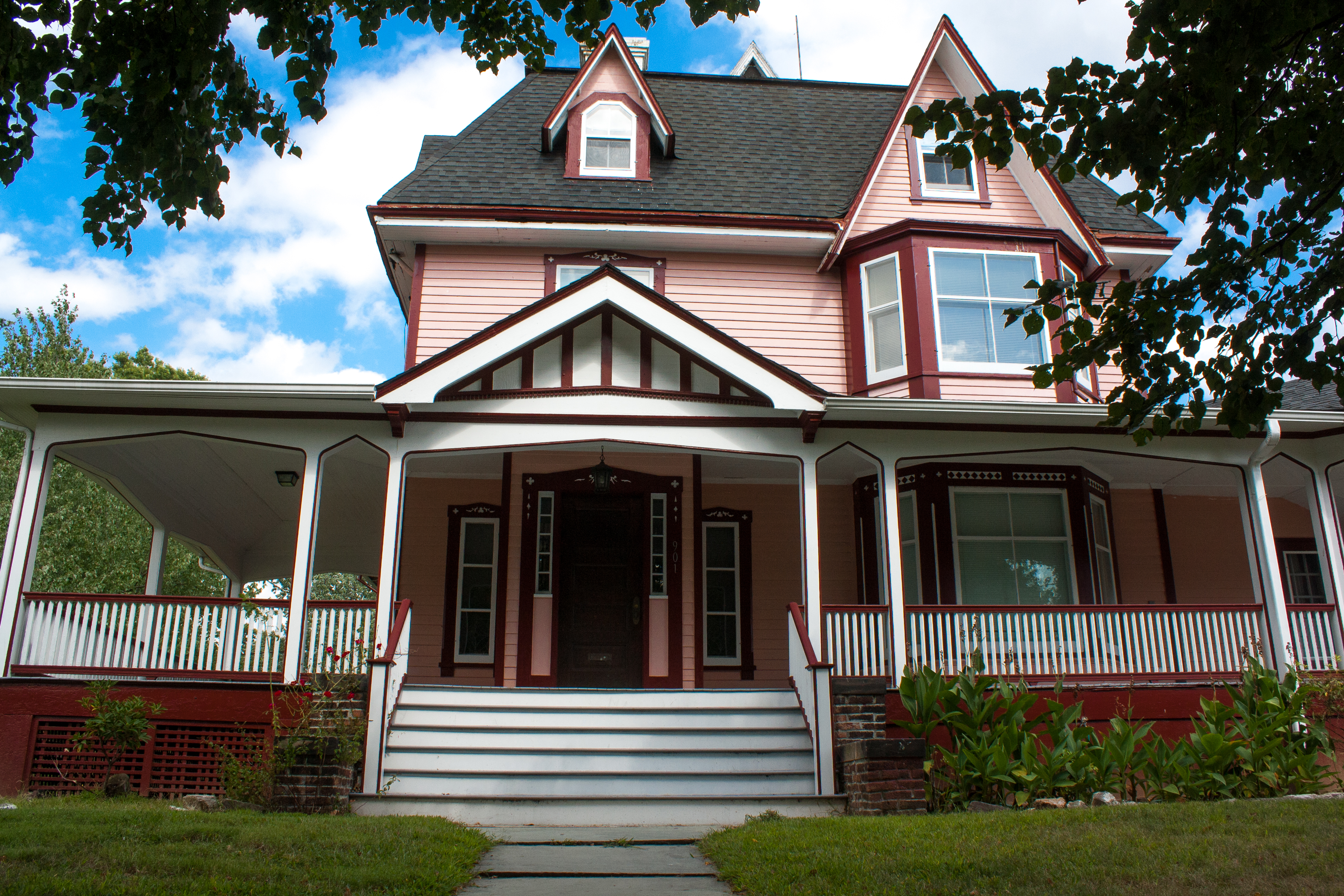
Victorian house at 901 Madison Avenue

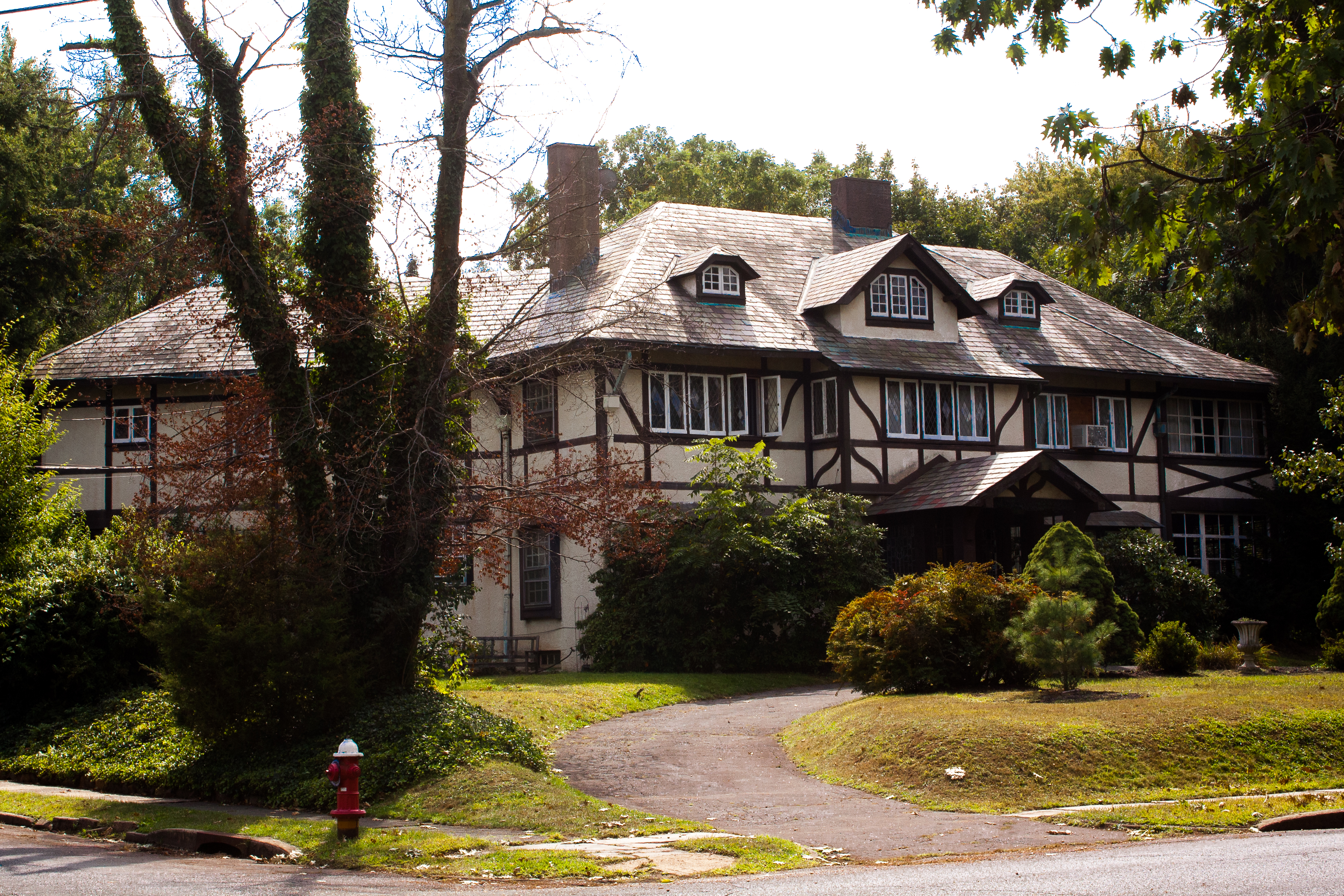
Tudor Revival house at 305 Stelle Avenue

== See also ==
- National Register of Historic Places listings in Union County, New Jersey
