= Van Wyck Brooks =

American literary critic, biographer and historian (1886–1963)

Portrait of Van Wyck Brooks by John Butler Yeats, 1909

Van Wyck Brooks (February 16, 1886 – May 2, 1963) was an American literary critic, biographer, and historian.

== Biography ==
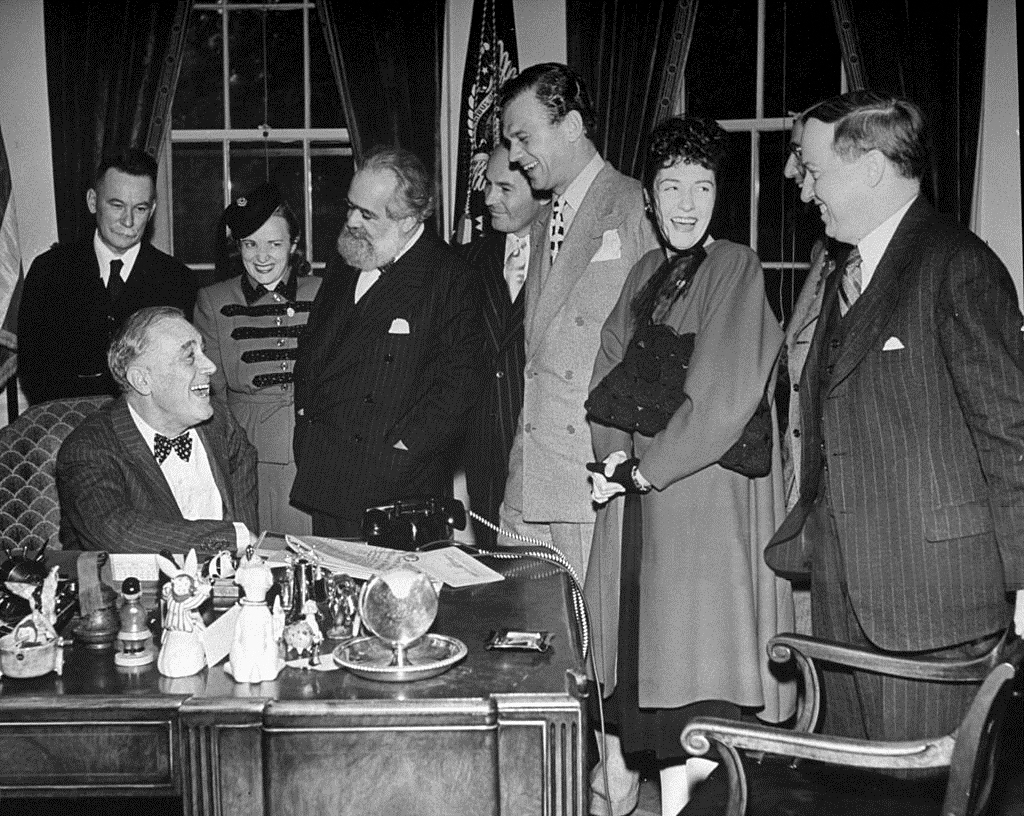
Members of the Independent Voters Committee of the Arts and Sciences for Roosevelt visit FDR at the White House (October 1944). From left: Van Wyck Brooks, Hannah Dorner, Jo Davidson, Jan Kiepura, Joseph Cotten, Dorothy Gish, Dr. Harlow Shapley

Brooks was born in Plainfield, New Jersey, in 1886 and graduated from Harvard University in 1908. As a student he published his first book, a collection of poetry called Verses by Two Undergraduates, co-written with his friend John Hall Wheelock.

Brooks's best-known work is a series of studies entitled Makers and Finders (five volumes, 1936–1952), which chronicled the development of American literature during the long 19th century. Brooks embroidered elaborate biographical detail into anecdotal prose. For The Flowering of New England, 1815–1865 (1936) he won the second National Book Award for Non-Fiction from the American Booksellers Association and the 1937 Pulitzer Prize for History. The book was also included in Life magazine's list of the 100 outstanding books of 1924–1944.

Brooks was a long-time resident of Bridgewater, Connecticut, which built a town library wing in his name. Although a decade-long fund-raising effort was abandoned in 1972, a hermit in Los Angeles, Charles E. Piggott, with no connection to Bridgewater surprised the town by leaving money for the library in his will. With $210,000 raised, the library addition went up in 1980.

Among his works, the book The Ordeal of Mark Twain (1920) analyzes the literary progression of Samuel L. Clemens and attributes shortcomings to Clemens's mother and wife. In 1925 he published a translation from French of the 1920 biography of Henry David Thoreau by Leon Bazalgette, entitled Henry Thoreau, Bachelor of Nature.

His influential 1918 essay "On Creating a Usable Past" argued that the United States lacked its own coherent cultural arts tradition. Historian Constance Rourke engaged his claim and set out to show a unique American tradition.

In 1944, Brooks was on the cover of Time Magazine.

He died in Bridgewater, Connecticut, from cancer on May 2, 1963.

== Bibliography ==
- 1905: Verses by Two Undergraduates (with John Hall Wheelock)
- 1908: The Wine of the Puritans: A Study of Present-Day America
- 1913: The Malady of the Ideal: Senancour, Maurice de Guérin, and Amiel
- 1914: John Addington Symonds: A Biographical Study
- 1915: The World of H.G. Wells
- 1915: America's Coming of Age
- 1918: On Creating a Usable Past
- 1920: The Ordeal of Mark Twain
- 1925: The Pilgrimage of Henry James
- 1925: Henry Thoreau, Bachelor of Nature (by Leon Bazalgette, translated by Van Wyck Brooks)
- 1932: The Life of Emerson
- 1934: Three Essays on America
- 1936: The Flowering of New England, 1815–1865 (Makers and Finders)
- 1940: New England: Indian Summer, 1865–1915 (Makers and Finders)
- 1941: Opinions of Oliver Allston
- 1941: On Literature Today
- 1944: The World of Washington Irving (Makers and Finders)
- 1947: The Times of Melville and Whitman (Makers and Finders)
- 1948: A Chilmark Miscellany
- 1952: The Confident Years: 1885–1915 (Makers and Finders)
- 1952: Makers and Finders: A History of the Writer in America, 1800–1915
- 1953: The Writer in America
- 1954: Scenes and Portraits: Memoirs of Childhood and Youth (An Autobiography)
- 1955: John Sloan: A Painter's Life
- 1956: Helen Keller: Sketch for a Portrait
- 1957: Days of the Phoenix: The Nineteen-Twenties I Remember (An Autobiography)
- 1958: The Dream of Arcadia: American Writers and Artists in Italy, 1760–1915
- 1958: From a Writer's Notebook
- 1959: Howells: His Life and World
- 1961: From the Shadow of the Mountain: My Post-Meridian Years (An Autobiography)
- 1962: Fenollosa and His Circle: With Other Essays in Biography
- 1965: An Autobiography

== Awards and honors ==
Brooks was elected to the American Philosophical Society in 1939. In 1949, he was elected to the American Academy of Arts and Sciences.

=== Places named after him ===
The Van Wyck Brooks Historic District, known for its old Victorian and Second French Empire style buildings in Plainfield, the town of his birth, is named after him.

=== Prizes ===
- 1937: Pulitzer Prize in history and National Book Award for 1936 nonfiction
- 1938: Goldmedaille des Limited Editions Club
- 1944: Carey Thomas Award for The World of Washington Irving
- 1946: Gold medal of National Institute of Arts and Letters (American Academy of Arts and Letters)
- 1953: Theodore Roosevelt Distinguished Service Medal
- 1954: Huntington Hartford Foundation Award
- 1957: Secondary Education Board Award for Helen Keller: Sketch for a Portrait

=== Honorary degrees ===
Doctor of Letters:

- Boston University
- Bowdoin College
- Columbia University
- Dartmouth College
- Fairleigh Dickinson University
- Harvard University
- Northeastern Illinois University
- Tufts University
- Union College
- University of Pennsylvania

Doctor of Humane Letters:

- Northwestern University
