= Davy Crockett (book) =

1934 children's biography by Constance Rourke

Davey Crockett
- Title page for Davy Crockett (1934)
- Author: Constance Rourke
- Illustrator: James MacDonald
- Language: English
- Genre: Children's literature
- Publisher: Harcourt
- Publication date: 1934
- Publication place: United States

Davy Crockett is a 1934 children's biography of the titular folk hero written by Constance Rourke and illustrated by James MacDonald. It follows Crockett's life growing up in Tennessee, his marriage at 19, fighting in the Creek Indian War in 1813-14, fighting against the United States during the Texas Revolution, and concludes with Crockett's death at the Battle of the Alamo. The book was recognized with a Newbery Honor in 1935.
