= Nancy Snow (academic) =

American professor and scholar

- Occupations: Professor; Author
- Years active: 1992–present
- Known for: Propaganda and Public Diplomacy
- Title: Professor or Dr.

Academic background
- Education: Clemson University, American University School of International Service
- Thesis: Fulbright Scholars as Cultural Mediators (1992)

Academic work
- Sub-discipline: foreign policy and media relations specialist
- Institutions: Department of State
- Main interests: communications, international relations, feminism, propaganda, public diplomacy
- Notable works: Propaganda, Inc. and Information War
- Notable ideas: Gender Diplomacy, Gender Diplomats
- Website: http://www.nancysnow.com

Nancy Snow is an American professor emeritus of communications at California State University, Fullerton and scholar of propaganda and public diplomacy. She has authored, edited or co-edited fifteen books, including Propaganda, Inc.: Selling America's Culture to the World, an overview of American cultural policy that includes a foreword by Herbert Schiller and introduction by Michael Parenti; and Information War: American Propaganda, Free Speech and Opinion Control since 9-11.

== Education ==
Snow graduated summa cum laude with a B.A. in political science from Clemson University.

Snow holds a Ph.D. in International Relations from American University School of International Service (SIS) where she concentrated in international/intercultural communication, peace and conflict resolution studies, and U.S. foreign policy.

In 2020 Snow held the Walt Disney Faculty Chair in Global Media and Communication in the Schwarzman Scholars Program at Tsinghua University in Beijing.
