= Zella Armstrong =

American historian and writer

- Died: April 12, 1965; Chattanooga, Tennessee, U.S.
- Occupation: Local historian

Zella Armstrong (died April 12, 1965) was an American local historian who authored books about the state of Tennessee and the Southern United States, including the five-volume Notable Southern Families. A member of the Tennessee Historical Commission, she founded the Cotton Ball in Chattanooga, Tennessee. In literary circles, Armstrong was well known by reason of her work as editor, writer of fiction, and compiler of historical and genealogical records.

A native of Chattanooga, she was a daughter of John MacMillan and Martha (Turnley) Armstrong. The father was born near Knoxville, Tennessee, and lived for many years in Chattanooga. He served as a captain of artillery in the Confederate army during Civil War. He married Martha Turnley, a daughter of Judge Mathew J. and Miriam (Isbell) Turnley, who lived in Alabama.

Armstrong spent her entire life in Chattanooga. She wrote largely for publications and was the author of two volumes, which were published under the name of Notable Southern Families. She was the owner and publisher of The Lookout, a southern weekly magazine. Her religious faith was that of the Presbyterian church and she belonged to the Kosmos Club. She was chair of historical research of the State Federation of Women's Clubs, was a member of the executive committee of the Tennessee Historical Commission and was president of the Tennessee Press and Authors Club. She was likewise president of the Chattanooga Press Club and vice president for Tennessee of the Confederate Memorial Association. During World War I, she was chair of the entertainment committee of the National League for Women's Service, under whose auspices nearly 100 entertainments were given for the Officers Training Camp at Fort Oglethorpe.

== Selected works ==
- Armstrong, Zella; Preston Collop French, Janie (1928). Notable Southern Families. Chattanooga, Tennessee: The Lookout Publishing Co. ISBN 9780806305080. OCLC 913500876.
- Armstrong, Zella (1945). History of the First Presbyterian Church of Chattanooga. Chattanooga, Tennessee: The Lookout Publishing Co. OCLC 5011247.
