= Constance Rourke =

American writer (1885–1941)

- Constance Rourke, Fall 1938
- Born: Constance Mayfield Rourke; November 14, 1885; Cleveland, Ohio, United States
- Died: March 29, 1941 (aged 55); Grand Rapids, Michigan, United States
- Occupations: Writer, historian, folklorist
- Writing career
- Notable work: American Humor
- Notable awards: Newbery Honor

Constance Mayfield Rourke (November 14, 1885 – March 29, 1941) was an American author and educator known for shaping the fields of American studies, American literature, and American folklore.

== Biography ==
Rourke was born in Cleveland, Ohio, to Constance Davis Rourke (née Elizabeth Davis) and Henry Button Rourke. Her father died in 1888; her mother then moved to Grand Rapids, Michigan, becoming a school principal with progressive ideas regarding education. Mrs. Rourke placed a strong emphasis on her daughter's education from a young age. Enrolling in Vassar College in 1903, Rourke focused on social criticism. She learned "that the art of the common people might be as 'good' for humanity as recognized masterpieces, and that the critic could spur democratic reform." She then studied in Europe, including at the Sorbonne, learning about education and literary criticism. On returning, she taught English at Vassar from 1910 to 1915 before turning her focus toward writing.

Rourke specialized in American popular culture. She wrote numerous pieces of criticism for magazines like The Nation and The New Republic. However, she made her name as a writer of biographies and biographical sketches of notable American figures, such as John James Audubon, P. T. Barnum, Lotta Crabtree, Davy Crockett, Harriet Beecher Stowe, and Charles Sheeler, as well as books exploring different components of American culture and its history, of which American Humor: A Study of the National Character, first published in 1931, is the most famous. It has never gone out of print. During the 1930s she worked on the Index of American Design as part of the Federal Art Project of the Works Progress Administration.

Her work was essential in the formation of the scholarly fields of American studies and American literature. In contrast to many critics of the time, such as Van Wyck Brooks, who believed that the United States lacked its own coherent cultural arts tradition – which he noted in his influential essay "On Creating a Usable Past" – Rourke set out to search for that "usable past" and show that the country indeed had its own unique tradition. She wrote:

For years critics lamented the absence of an American folklore and building from this hypothesis, have formed dreary conclusions as to the future of the American arts. But our folklore is now seen to be abundant. Enough of this has come to the surface to indicate that, whatever its derivations, it is unlike that of other peoples in its essential patterns. Through it our early fantasies and mythologies are coming back to us, showing the secure beginnings of a native poetry and a native language; and the flow of these patterns into literary expression can be traced from Hawthorne and Melville to Mark Twain and Emily Dickinson and Edwin Arlington Robinson.

Rourke also held that American culture took influence from both Native Americans and African Americans, which had developed and maintained their own forms of culture.

She died in Grand Rapids, Michigan, in 1941. At her death, The New York Times stated, "To her, too, the songs and sayings, the ballads, the boasts, and the brashness of farmer, lumberjack, or wandering worker were something worthy of preservation."

Two of her books, Audubon and Davy Crockett, received the Newbery Honor award. She was featured on the cover of The Saturday Review of Literature. Rourke was inducted into the Michigan Women's Hall of Fame in 2004.

== Legacy ==
Rourke's work, especially American Humor, made a significant impact on the early twentieth century study of American popular culture and folk culture. From her death onwards, selections from Rourke's works were regularly anthologized.

A biography by Joan Shelley Rubin was published in 1980.

Nevertheless, Rourke's works and their apparent influence have faded significantly. Many of her books are out of print and recent anthologies, for instance of American studies, do not mention her. However, Rourke continues to have some notable fans who make significant claims for her work and importance. Perhaps the most important work in this vein is Michael Denning's book, The Cultural Front.

The American rock critic Greil Marcus wrote an introduction to a 2004 edition of American Humor.

Most recently, on Rourke's birthday in 2011, Lucy Sante had these words to say:

Constance Rourke (1885–1941) died – from a slip on an icy porch – way too young. If she had finished her projected five-volume Roots of American Culture, it might have synthesized all her research into a grand Key to the American Scriptures. As it is she wrote solid if unexciting books on Davy Crockett, John James Audubon, Charles Sheeler, the Beecher family, and Lotta Crabtree, "Fairy Star of the Gold Rush". But she also wrote American Humor (1931), fruit of prolonged and concentrated squinting into the mists, attempting to make out the first stirrings of an American culture that was free from second-guessing based on overseas models. Peering into the taverns and opera houses and faro parlors of the Jacksonian era she came to the conclusion that the primal scene occurred in humor. "Laughter produced the illusion of leveling obstacles in a world which was full of unaccustomed obstacles." She discerned three essential figures: the Yankee peddler, the backwoodsman, and the Negro minstrel. "Each in a fashion of his own had broken bonds ... As figures they embodied a deep-lying mood of disseverance, carrying the popular fancy further and further from any fixed or traditional heritage." She followed the three out to the frontier, riding on a wave of jokes and coinages and hoaxes and cuttings-up. The first half of the book is a breathless bravura performance; the book as a whole sits right between William Carlos Williams's in the American Grain and Thomas Pynchon's Mason & Dixon.

== Books ==
- Trumpets of Jubilee. New York: Harcourt, Brace & Company, 1927.
- Troupers on the Gold Coast, or The Rise of Lotta Crabtree. New York: Harcourt, Brace & Company, 1928.
- American Humor: a Study of the National Character. 1931. Reprint. New York: Harcourt Brace Jovanovich, 1959. Reprint. New York: New York Review Books Classics, 2004. (Latter with Introduction by Greil Marcus.)
- Davy Crockett. New York: Harcourt, Brace & Company, 1934.
- Audubon. New York: Harcourt, Brace & Company, 1936. It retroactively received the Newbery Honor award for the year 1937.
- Charles Sheeler: Artist in the American Tradition. New York: Harcourt, Brace & Company, 1938.
- The Roots of American Culture, edited by Van Wyck Brooks. New York: Harcourt, Brace & World, 1942.
