= James Wakefield Burke =

American journalist (1906–1989)

- Born: 1906
- Died: 1989 (aged 82–83)
- Occupations: Journalist and Writer

James Wakefield Burke (1906–1989) was an American journalist and writer.

== Biography ==
Burke worked as a salesman and executive sales manager in Chicago until 1941. Then he became a lieutenant colonel in the US Army Air Force as a test pilot. After World War II Burke made a living as a journalist. From 1945 till 1954 he was stationed in Berlin as correspondent of the magazine Esquire. He reported from the Nuremberg trials and acted as a public relations adviser to General Lucius D. Clay. Subsequently he was Public Relations Officer for Generals Joseph T. McNarney, Clay and Frank L. Howley (then American commandant in Berlin).

Burke published the book The Big Rape ("A Historical novel of the fall of Berlin") in 1951. It centers on sexual crimes committed by Soviet Soldiers in Berlin during the capture of the German capital in April and May 1945. The book has been described as both racist and misogynistic by Ingrid Schmidt-Harzbach. Klaus Martens criticized a stereotypical characterization of nations and races by Burke and insinuates a connection between the author and the CIA's Psychological Warfare Department. The German edition followed in 1952 (The Big Rape - Die große Vergewaltigung), by Amsel Publishing House. A Paperback edition in German was published in 1953 under the title Frau komm!.

Burke published a "fast paced crime novel" in 1954, Three Days pass – To Kill. A German edition titled Ami – Go Home! was translated by Dietrich Bogulinski.

Burke published a total of 26 works. The manuscript of the novel Of a Strange Woman (1955) is stored in the University of Kentucky Special Collections.
